= List of apple cultivars (A–K) =

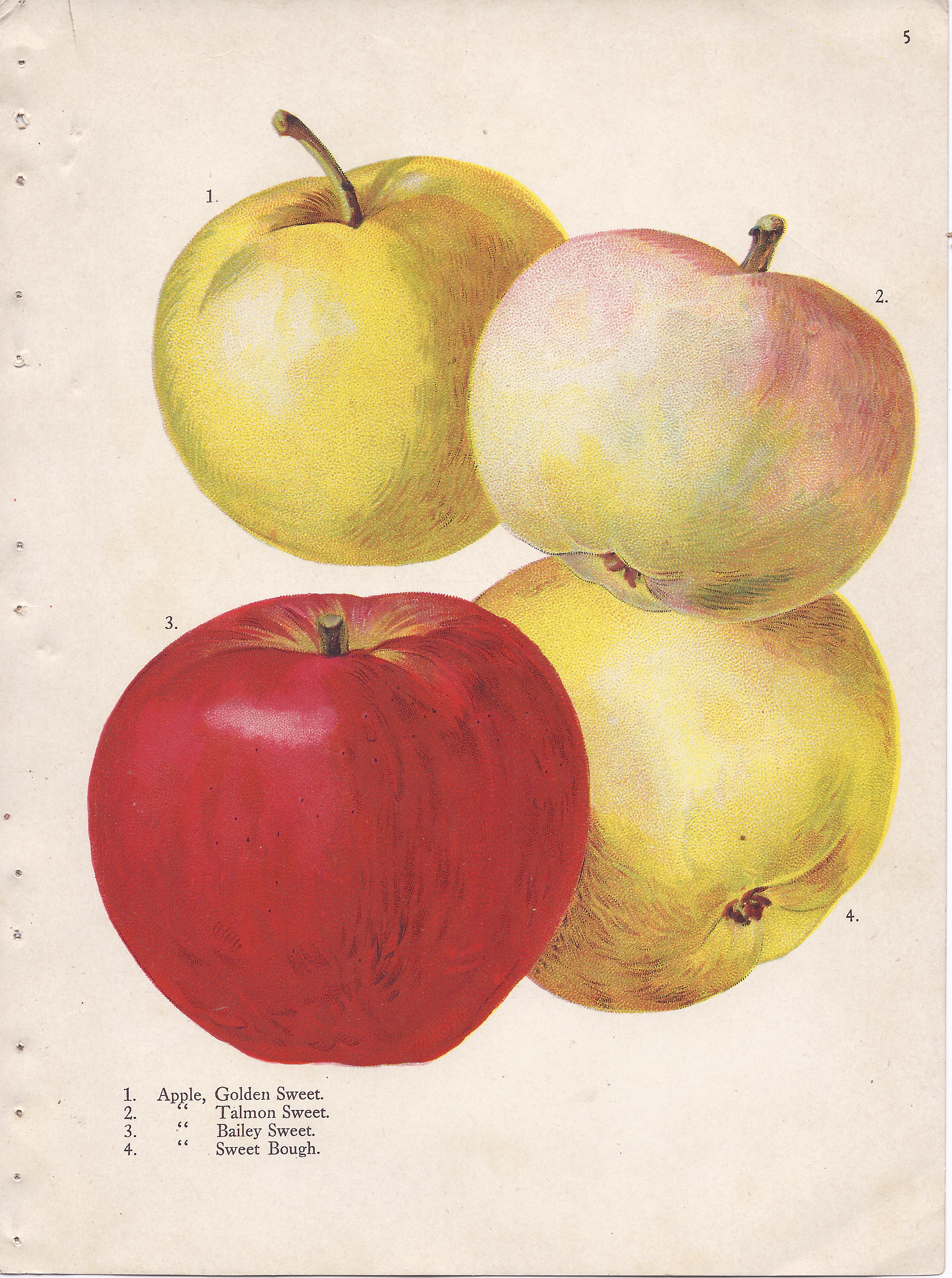
1909 illustrations by Alois Lunzer depicting apple cultivars Golden Sweet, Talmon Sweet, Bailey Sweet and Sweet Bough

Over 7,500 cultivars of the culinary or eating apple (Malus domestica) are known. Some are extremely important economically as commercial products, though the vast majority are not suitable for mass production. In the following list, use for "eating" means that the fruit is consumed raw, rather than cooked. Cultivars used primarily for making cider are indicated. Those varieties marked agm have gained the Royal Horticultural Society's Award of Garden Merit.

This list does not include the species and varieties of apples collectively known as crab apples, which are grown primarily for ornamental purposes, though they may be used to make jelly or compote. These are described under Malus.

== Table of apples ==
=== Abbreviations ===
Abbreviations	Full form	Abbreviations	Full form
AC	Apple canker	AM	Award of Merit
AS	Apple scab	AGM	RHS Award of Garden Merit
C, VitC	Vitamin C mg/100g	BB	Biennial bearing
FCC	First Class Certificat	DBH	Days from full bloom to harvest
PW	Powdery mildew	P	Parentage
RHS	Royal Horticultural Society	r	Resistant
PickG Pickg	Harvest time in Germany	Pick45	Harvest time at places with a mean annual temperature of 45 °F (7 °C)
PickE Picke	Harvest time in south England	Pick50	Harvest time at places with a mean annual temperature of 50 °F (10 °C)
s	Susceptible	Pick55	Harvest time at places with a mean annual temperature of 55 °F (13 °C)
TA	Titratable acidity %	SS	Soluble solids %
TRI	Triploid		
Languages
cs.	Czech (Čeština)	da.	Danish (Dansk)
de.	German (Deutsch)	fr.	French (Français)
hu.	Hungarian (Magyar)	nl.	Dutch (Nederland)
no.	Norwegian (Norsk)	pl.	Polish (Polski)
ru.	Russian (Русский; Russky)	sv.	Swedish (Svenska)

=== A ===
Common name	Image	Origin	First developed	Comment	Use	Pick/Use period
Abbondanza (a.k.a. Belfort)		Italy	1896	Width 70–75 mm, height 65 mm. Cold Storage 3 °C 150 days.	Cooking	PickE mid-October. Use January–March
Abram (a.k.a. Abraham, Abraham's apple, Father Abram, Father Abraham, de. Abraham's Apfel)		US	<1755	A small apple with red flush. Flesh white, tender, subacid. It was likely brought to the US by settlers from northern Germany where it was grown as the Danziger Kantapfel.	Cooking, Eating	Use October–March
Acheson		Alberta, Canada	Introduced 1941	Fruit large, greenish yellow. Parentage Delicious x unknown.	Eating	Use August–September
Acklam Russet		Yorkshire, England	1768	A small russet apple. Cells ovate, axile. An excellent dessert apple of first rate quality.	Eating	PickE mid-October. Use November–March.
Adams Pearmain (a.k.a. Adam's Parmane, cs. Adamsova parména, de. Adams Parmäne, sv. Adams parmän)		Norfolk or Herefordshire, England	Introduced 1826	A dessert apple. First introduced under the name "Norfolk Pippin". Width 64 mm (2.5 in), height 63 mm (2.5 in). Cells obovate, abaxile. Flesh pale yellow, crisp, fine-textured, firm, juicy, subacid, aromatic, very good.	Eating	PickE early- to mid-October.
Adersleber Calville (cs. Aderslebenský kalvil)		Saxony, Germany	1830–1840	A green apple with red flush. Width 72 mm (2.8 in), height 58 mm (2.3 in). Stalk 16 mm (0.63 in). Parentage Calville blanc d'Hiver x Alexander. Flesh; aromatic, subacid to sweet. VitC 10. Cold Storage 0 °C 150 days.	Eating	PickE mid-September. PickG mid–late October. Use November–January.
Adina (a.k.a. Frankad, Satark)		Queensland, Australia	1950s, introduced in 1988	A large red apple. Flesh firm, juicy, sweet, very good. Tree vigorous. Parentage Golden Delicious x William's Favourite	Eating	
Admiral (cs. Admirál)		Czech Republic	2012	New very popular variety. Flesh firm, crisp, juicy with very good taste. Robust, healthy, scab resistant variety with excellent keeping qualities and taste.	Eating	PickE early October
Advance (a.k.a. Laxton Advance)		Bedford, England	Raised 1908, introduced 1929	Early dessert apple. Medium size. Yellow with brown-red flush. Award of Merit from RHS in 1932. Flesh; greenish white, soft, fine-textured, juicy, aromatic.	Eating	PickE early- to mid-August; use August–September
Adzamovka		Croatia		A yellow conical apple with red stripes. Width 60–70 mm (2.4–2.8 in), height 50–60 mm (2.0–2.4 in), weight 110–150 g (3.9–5.3 oz). Flesh juicy, subacid.	Eating, cider	Use November
Ahrina		Germany	1993	A large roundish apple. Flesh juicy, subacid.	Eating	Pick late September; use November–February
Ahrista		Ahrensburg, Germany			Eating	
Aia Ilu		Estonia	1946	A large apple, weighing 250–300 g (8.8–10.6 oz). Yellow skin, juicy flesh, bittersweet with a weak aroma.	Eating	
Airlie Red Flesh (a.k.a. Newell-Kimzey)		Airlie, Oregon, US	c. 1961	A large, conic apple. Light yellow-green skin strewn with white dots, occasionally with a faint reddish orange blush. Light pink to deep red flesh is crisp, sweet and mildly tart.	Eating	
Akane (a.k.a. Tohoko)		Fujisaki, Aomori, Japan	Cross made 1939, selected 1953, introduced 1970.	A red apple. Parentage Jonathan × Worcester Pearmain. Tangy taste. Flesh is white, firm, crisp, juicy, subacid.	Eating	Pick45 August 21. PickE mid- to late-August. PickG mid-August.
Åkerö		Sweden	Possibly 1759	Apple is egg-shaped, medium to large in size, sweet and aromatic. Width 68 mm (2.7 in), height 68 mm (2.7 in). Stalk 20–25 mm (0.79–0.98 in). Grown mostly in Sweden and Estonia.	Eating	Best in November; keeps until February
Akin		Illinois, US	1831	Tree vigorous. Width 68 mm (2.7 in), height 52 mm (2.0 in). Stalk 20 mm (0.79 in). Flesh is yellow, crisp, tender, juicy, subacid, aromatic, good to very good.	Eating	Use January–June
Alamanka		North Macedonia		A green apple (round to conical) with red stripes. Weight 100 g (3.5 oz). Flesh is juicy, subacid with poor aroma.	Eating	Pick October; use November
Alantapfel (a.k.a. Princesse Noble)		Germany	<1750	An oblong apple. Width 56–63 mm (2.2–2.5 in), height 59–73 mm (2.3–2.9 in). Stalk 13–16 mm (0.51–0.63 in). Flesh is sugary, aromatic.	Eating	Pick October; use December–March
Alaska		California, US	Introduced 1944	Flesh is white. Tree is a heavy producer.	Eating	
Albrechtapfel (a.k.a. Prinz Albrecht von Preussen)		Germany	1865	Parentage Alexander x unknown. Width 60–85 mm (2.4–3.3 in), height 55–63 mm (2.2–2.5 in), weight 80–200 g (2.8–7.1 oz). Stalk 10–30 mm (0.39–1.18 in). Flesh is soft, juicy, subacid. Cold Storage 4 °C 90 days. VitC 9. Density 0.76	Eating, cooking	PickG late September–mid-October. Use October–December
Albury Park Nonsuch		Surrey, England	<1892	Yellow with red flush. AM from RHS in 1892. Flesh crisp, juicy, subacid.	Cooking	Use December–March
Aldenham Purple		Hertfordshire, England	1925	A red apple. Width 63 mm (2.5 in), height 48 mm (1.9 in). Stalk 15–25 mm (0.59–0.98 in)	Eating, cooking	Pick September; use September–October
Alderman		Scotland	Before 1923	A golden yellow apple. Width 90 mm (3.5 in), height 71 mm (2.8 in). Stalk short to medium. Flesh is white, very firm, coarse-textured, crisp, moderately juicy, acid.	Baking	Pick mid-September; use October–December
Alexander (a.k.a. Emperor Alexander, de. Kaiser Alexander, fr. Grand-Alexandre, pl. Aporta, ru. Aporta, Gusevkoe, Aport ukraininskii, Aport osennii)		Russia	<1800	A very large apple. Width 95–110 mm (3.7–4.3 in), height 75–90 mm (3.0–3.5 in). Stalk 11–18 mm (0.43–0.71 in). Cells ovate, axile. Flesh is a faint yellow, firm, crisp, very soft, mild subacid, fair to good. Tree is vigorous. Particularly attractive blossom.	Eating, cooking, baking, drying	PickE mid-September; use September–December
Alfriston		Sussex, England	Late 1700s	Raised at Uckfield Sussex by Mr Shepherd. A large acid green apple. Flesh; pale yellow, crisp, yellow, subacid, pear-like flavour. Cells elliptical, abaxile. Award of Merit from RHS in 1920. Width 83 mm (3.3 in), height 76 mm (3.0 in).	Cooking, Juice	PickE early October; use November–April
Alice		Sweden	1964	Medium size. Yellow with red stripes. Flesh juicy, aromatic. Parentage Ingrid Marie x Gyllenkroks Astrakan.	Eating	PickE late August–early September; use September–October
Alkmene agm		Germany	1930	Parentage Cox's Orange Pippin × Doktor Oldenburg. Width 58 mm (2.3 in), height 58 mm (2.3 in), weight 120 g (4.2 oz). Flesh is crisp, aromatic, juicy, subacid to sweet. Stalk 9–20 mm (0.35–0.79 in). Cold Stoprage 4 °C 90 days. Density 0.82	Eating	PickE late September. PickG early–mid-September. Pickg September 4–15. Use September–November
Allen's Everlasting			Before 1864	Late-keeping desert apple. First Class Certificate from RHS in 1899. Cells obovate, axile. Flesh is greenish-white, firm, fine-textured, juicy, fair.	Eating	PickE mid-October; use February–April
Allington Pippin		Lincolnshire, United Kingdom	1880s, introduced 1896	A versatile English dessert apple raised by horticulturalist Thomas Laxton some time before 1884. Exhibited as Brown's South Lincoln Beauty, the name was changed to Allington Pippin by Bunyard Nursery in 1896. A cross of Cox's Orange Pippin and King of the Pippins. Flesh is creamy white, fine textured, aromatic, with a pineapple-like flavour. The apple keeps its shape when cooked. Width 68–74 mm (2.7–2.9 in), height 61–70 mm (2.4–2.8 in), stalk 7–15 mm (0.28–0.59 in). First Class Certificate from RHS in 1894. Cold storage 2 °C 120 days.	Eating, cooking, dessert	PickE late September–early October; use October–February
All Summer		Pennsylvania, US	Before 1850	Flesh is white, tender, very good. Tree uas slow growth is an annual bearer, and is productive. Stalk slender.	Eating	Use July–August
Almeda		Tennessee, US	Introduced 1939	Fruit large, green. Flesh subacid.	Cooking	Ripens 25 July–5 August
Altländer Pfannkuchenapfel		Germany	1840	Width 67 mm (2.6 in), height 51 mm (2.0 in), weight 115 g (4.1 oz). Stalk 10–20 mm (0.39–0.79 in). Flesh is crisp, dry, acid. Cold storage 1-2 °C 180 days. VitC 14. Density 0.86	Cooking, eating	PickE mid- to late October. Pick G late October. Use March–May
Alvanija (a.k.a. Elvanija, Ilvanija)		Croatia		A green oblong apple with red flush. Width 60–75 mm (2.4–3.0 in), height 65–80 mm (2.6–3.1 in), weight 110–140 g (3.9–4.9 oz). Flesh is firm, juicy.	Eating, cooking, cider	Use October
Ambrosia		British Columbia, Canada	1980s	Medium to large in size, mostly red coloration with yellow patches. Has cream-coloured flesh with a sweet, crisp, aromatic flavour and low acidity. Ambrosia trees are hardy and no major disadvantages have yet been identified.	Eating	Pick45 September 15. Pick55 September 5.
American Beauty		Massachusetts, US	Before 1855	Tree vigorous, productive, annual bearer. Stalk short. Flesh is yellowish, tender, juicy, subacid, aromatic, very good.	Eating	PickE mid- to late October. Use December–April
American Golden Pippin (a.k.a. Golden Pippin, Ribbed Pippin, Golding, New York Greening, Newtown Greening, Golden Apple)		US	Before 1850	Yellow with russet. Flesh is yellowish, juicy, aromatic, subacid, very good. Width 79 mm (3.1 in), height 65 mm (2.6 in). Stalk 16 mm (0.63 in). Tree does not bear young.	Eating	Use November–February
American Golden Russet (a.k.a. Golden Russet, Sheep Nose, Bullock's Pippin, Little Pearmain)		US	Late 1700s	Yellow with brown overcolour and grey russet. Width 64–74 mm (2.5–2.9 in), height 58–72 mm (2.3–2.8 in). Stalk 13–23 mm (0.51–0.91 in). Flesh is yellowish, tender, juicy sugary, lightly aromatic, best.	Eating	PickE early to mid-October. Use October–January
American Melon (see Melon American)						
American Mother (see Mother)						
American Summer Pearmain (see Summer Pearmain American)						
Anabela		Brazil	Introduced 1995	Parentage Gala x Anna. A yellow apple with (30–40%) red flush. Flesh is juicy, sweet, very good. Tree vigorous.	Eating	
Ananas Reinette (cs. Ananasová reneta, de. Ananas Renette, fr. Reinette ananas, pl. Reneta Ananasowa, ru. Ananasnîi renet)		Netherlands	Before 1800	A small yellow apple with pineapple flavor. Width 48–65 mm (1.9–2.6 in), height 52–65 mm (2.0–2.6 in). Weight 115 g (4.1 oz). Stalk 11–20 mm (0.43–0.79 in). Flesh is crisp, juicy, aromatic, acid. VitC 21.	Eating, juice	PickE early October. PickG mid- to late October. Use December–February
Anisovka (a.k.a. Anis koritschnevoje, Anis polosatyiy)		Russia	Before 1850	Medium size, round, greenish yellow with red stripes.	Cooking, eating	Pick September; use October–December
Anna		Israel	Introduced 1963	Colour is yellow with a red blush. Parentage Red Hadassiya x Golden Delicious. This variety does not grow well in the cold and prefers heat and humidity. Tree is annually productive.	Eating	
Anna Boelens		Netherlands	1914, introduced 1934	A green apple with red overcolor(40-70%). Width 77 mm, height 58 mm. Stalk 15 mm. Flesh white, juicy, subacid. Parentage Cox Orange x Berlepsch.	Eating	Use October - November
Annie Elizabeth		Leicester, Leicestershire, England	1857, introduced 1868	Large yellow apple, FCC from RHS in 1868. Width 79–87 mm (3.1–3.4 in), height 63–65 mm (2.5–2.6 in). Stalk 9–18 mm (0.35–0.71 in). Cells, obovate, abaxile.Flesh; creamy white, firm, coarse-textured, dry acid. Cooks well, breaks up completely.	Cooking	PickE late September–early October; use November–April
Annurca		Campania, Italy	1876 (documented)	Very old apple; possibly one of the oldest of all. Believed to be much older than first mention in Pasquale's Manuale di Arboricultura, 1876. May be related to apples found in frescoes found in Herculaneum or Pompeii if not the same one.	Eating	PickE late October. Use November–January.
Antonovka (a.k.a. Possarts Nalivia, de. Antonowka, fr. Antonovca, pl. Antónówka zwykla, ru. Antonoka Obîknovennaia)		Kursk, Russia	Before 1800	A very old Russian variety, often planted at dachas. Apples are large, yellow-green and bracingly tart to eat out of hand, but superb for cooking, as they keep their shape. Width 55–70 mm (2.2–2.8 in), height 55–70 mm (2.2–2.8 in). Stalk 10 mm (0.39 in). Extremely tolerant of cold weather, and because it produces a single, deep taproot (unusual among apple trees), Antonovka is propagated for use as a rootstock. Antonovka rootstock provides a cold-hardy (to −45 °C (−49 °F)), well-anchored, vigorous, standard-sized tree. C 15.	Cooking, cider	PickE early September. Use October–December
Antonovka Safrannoje		Russia	1909	A large yellow apple with red flush. Parentage Antonovka x Renet Orleanski	Eating, cooking	
Apfel aus Grignon			Before 1800	A yellow apple with red flush and russet. Width 82 mm (3.2 in), height 66 mm (2.6 in). Stalk 30 mm (1.2 in).	Eating, cooking	Use December–March
Api (a.k.a. Lady Apple)		France	1628	Very tiny apple. Would fit in the palm of the hand of an adult. Width 52–56 mm (2.0–2.2 in), height 32–42 mm (1.3–1.7 in). Stalk 5–9 mm (0.20–0.35 in).	Eating	PickE mid-October. Use January–May.
Api Etoile (a.k.a. Star Apple, Star Lady Apple, cs. Api hvězdovité, de. Sternapi)		Switzerland or France	1600s	A small star shaped apple. It has light green and pink skin. Its thick and waxy skin protects its flesh from moisture.	Eating	PickE mid to late October.
Api Noir (a.k.a. Black Lady Apple)		France	Late 1700s	A desert apple, inferior to the Api.	Eating	PickE mid to late October. Use December–April.
Aport		Kazakhstan	1865	Several subcultivars exist. A dessert apple. Produced as a hybrid between the domestic apple, M. Domestica, and a wild apple, Malus sieversii.	Eating	PickE in Autumn.
Apple of Commerce 1 (see Beach); Apple of Commerce 2 (see Collins)
Apollo		Germany	1976	Cox's Orange Pippin × Geheimrat Dr. Oldenburg. Width 69 mm (2.7 in), height 59 mm (2.3 in), weight 140 g (4.9 oz). Stalk 13 mm (0.51 in). Flesh is soft, juicy, aromatic, subacid to sweet.	Eating	PickG early–mid-September; use September–October
Arapka (a.k.a. Bugarka)		Montenegro		A red oblong conical apple. Width 61 mm (2.4 in), height 66 mm (2.6 in). Weight 118 g (4.2 oz). Flesh soft, juicy, sweet, subacid, with a pronounced flavour.	Cooking	Use October–May
Ard Cairn Russet		Cork, Ireland	c. 1890	Medium-sized long-keeping dessert apple. Award of Merit from RHS in 1910. Width 69 mm (2.7 in), height 63 mm (2.5 in). Stalk variable. Flesh; creamy white, firm, slightly aromatic flavour. Tree vigorous.	Eating	PickE late September–early October; use October–January
Ariane		Angers, France	2002	Scab resistant. Developed at the National Institute of Agricultural Research in France. Parentage (Florina x Prima) x (Golden Delicious x unknown)	Eating	Pick with Golden Delicious
Arkansas Black (a.k.a. Arkansas, Mammoth Black Twig)		Arkansas, US	c. 1870	Hard and crunchy; stores well. Width 69 mm (2.7 in), height 60 mm (2.4 in). Stalk 20 mm (0.79 in). Very deep red, appearing black from a distance. Flesh is yellow, firm, tender, juicy, subacid, crisp, good.	Eating	Pick45 October 22. Pick55 October 15. PickE late October. Use December–May
Arlet		Dietikon, Switzerland	Introduced 1984	Width 72 mm, height 66 mm. Parentage Golden Delicious x Idared. 55-100% Red overcolor. Flesh is crisp, juicy, aromatic, subacid.	Eating	PickG early–mid-October. Use November–February.
Armorel		Newbury, Berkshire, England	Introduced 1893	A small yellow apple with russet. FCC from RHS in 1892. Flesh crisp, good.	Eating	Use February–May
Aroma		Balsgård, Fjälkestad, Sweden	1947, Introduced 1973.	A yellow apple with red flush. Width 63 mm (2.5 in), height 58 mm (2.3 in). Parentage Ingrid Marie x Filippa.	Eating	PickE early October. Use November–December
Aromatic Russet (fr. Rouge Aromatisée)		England	<1831	Width 55 mm, height 50 mm. Flesh is greenish white, firm, subacid, aromatic.	Eating	PickE mid-October. Use November–February
Arreskov		Denmark	Before 1860	A yellow apple with a pleasant aroma reminiscent of gravenstein. Width 77–85 mm (3.0–3.3 in), height 66–75 mm (2.6–3.0 in). Stalk 8–15 mm (0.31–0.59 in). Flesh is firm, dry, aromatic, subacid. Tree vigorous.	Eating, juice, drying.	Pick September. Use September–October.
Arthur Turner agm		Buckinghamshire, England	Before 1912, introduced 1914	Width 80–88 mm (3.1–3.5 in), height 48–76 mm (1.9–3.0 in). Stalk 10–16 mm (0.39–0.63 in). Large golden cooker: prone to mildew but scab resistant. Award of Merit from RHS in 1912. Flesh is creamy white, coarse-textured, dry, subacid. Parentage Alfriston x unknown.	Cooking, baking	PickE late September; use September–November
Arthur W. Barnes		Chester, England	Raised 1902, introduced 1928	Parentage Gascoyne's Scarlet x Cox Orange. A yellow apple with red flush. Width 82 mm (3.2 in), height 70 mm (2.8 in). Stalk medium. Flesh is white, firm, fine textured, very juicy, acid.	Cooking	PickE mid- to late September; use November–March
Ashmead's Kernelagm		Gloucestershire, England	c. 1700	Flesh is pale yellow, juicy, subacid and very aromatic. Width 54–64 mm (2.1–2.5 in), height 54–57 mm (2.1–2.2 in). Stalk 7–12 mm (0.28–0.47 in). Cells obovate, axile, slit.	Eating	PickE early–mid-October; use December–February
Ashmore		US	Before 1840	Width 85 mm (3.3 in), height 66 mm (2.6 in). Stalk 11 mm (0.43 in). Flesh is yellowish-white, crisp, juicy, subacid, very good.	Cooking, eating	Use September–October
Astillisch		Germany	Raised 1929	Parentage Red Astrachan x Signe Tillisch. Width 63–70 mm, height 56 mm. Flesh yellowish-white, juicy, soft, subacid.	Eating	Pick August. Use August.
Astramel		Jork, Germany		Parentage Red Astrachan x (James Grieve x Melba).	Eating	PickG and use early–mid-August
Atalanta		England	Before 1891, introduced 1893	Lemon yellow with red streaks. AM from RHS in 1891. Tree vigorous.	Cooking, eating	PickE late September–early October. Use November–January
Atha		Cullman County, Alabama	Selected c. 1915. Introduced c. 1930.	Parentage Red Astrachan x unknown. Tree nearly resembles Yellow Transparent, but is more vigorous and has less tendency to biennial bearing.		
Atlas		Ottawa, Canada	selected 1912, introduced 1924	A truncate conical yellow apple with red stripes. Width 67 mm (2.6 in), height 67 mm (2.6 in). Hardiness zone 4a.	Eating, cooking	PickE early September; use October–December
Auksis		Lithuania	1951	McIntosh x Gravenstein	Eating	
Auralia (see Tumanga)
Aurora Golden Gala		British Columbia, Canada	2003	Dessert apple; medium size, sweet, juicy, crisp, firm, very long storage life. Width 83 mm (3.3 in), height 77 mm (3.0 in). Weight 265–288 g (9.3–10.2 oz). Stalk 21–33 mm (0.83–1.30 in). P Splendour x Gala. SS 14.2, TA 0.58-0.75.	Eating	Pick early October. Use October–March.
Ausbacher Roter (a.k.a. Ausbacher Rotapfel)		Ausbach, Hesse, Germany	1770, introduced 1870	A yellow apple with red flush. Width 77 mm (3.0 in), height 70 mm (2.8 in). Stalk 12 mm (0.47 in). Tree vigorous. Flesh is white to greenish yellow, subacid. Quality: cooking good, eating fair.	Cooking	Pick late September; use October–April
Austin Sweet		Pennsylvania, US	<1875	Flesh white, juicy, sweet, very good. Stalk short.	Eating	Use September–December
Autumn Glory		Washington, US	2011	The Autumn Glory variety is a hybrid of the Fuji (apple) and the Golden Delicious apple, featuring a red over golden background. Very sweet, firm flesh with a subtle "cinnamon" flavor. Produced only by Domex Superfresh Growers in Washington's Yakima Valley.	Eating	
Automn Pearmain (a.k.a. Summer Pearmain)		England	1588	Green with russet and red overcolour. width 67–72 mm (2.6–2.8 in), height 60–68 mm (2.4–2.7 in). Stalk 12–17 mm (0.47–0.67 in). Cells obovate, axile. Flesh is creamy white, fairly firm, nutty and slightly aromatic.	Eating	PickE late September; use September–November
Avajlilja		Turkey		A green apple with red flush. Tolerant to common apple diseases and pests. Flesh has sweet-sour taste, with a weak aroma.		

=== B ===
Common name	Image	Origin	First developed	Comment	Use	Pick/Use period
Babovača		Montenegro		A green apple with red flush. Width 96 mm (3.8 in), height 79 mm (3.1 in), weight 250 g (8.8 oz). Stalk very short. Flesh soft, sweet and sour.		Use October–April
Bailey (a.k.a. Bailey Sweet)		Wyoming County, New York, US	c. 1840	Red apple with considerable white flecks. Has some russeting. Width 86 mm (3.4 in), height 74 mm (2.9 in). Stalk 21 mm (0.83 in). Flesh yellow, tender, juicy, very sweet, very good.	Eating, cooking	Use October
Baker's Delicious		Wales	<1932	A yellow apple with orange-red flush. Width 63 mm (2.5 in), height 58 mm (2.3 in). Stalk short. Flesh; creamy white, firm, crisp, juicy, aromatic.	Eating	PickE late August–early September; use August–September
Baldwin (a.k.a. Woodpecker, Pecker, Butters)		Massachusetts, US	c. 1740	Flesh yellowish white, crisp, sweet to subacid flavor, very good. Width 76–81 mm (3.0–3.2 in), height 68 mm (2.7 in). Stalk 22 mm (0.87 in). Tree vigorous. Very old variety for North America. Makes much juice. Cold storage 0 °C 150 days. TRI DBH 160.	Cooking, Eating	Pick50 October 14. PickE mid-October. Use November–March
Ballinora		England	<1898	Golden yellow with red flush. Width 79 mm (3.1 in), height 56 mm (2.2 in). AM from RHS in 1898.	Cooking, eating	Use December–January
Ball's Pippin		England	<1920	A green-yellow apple with red flush and russet. P Cox Orange x Sturmer Pippin. Flesh white, juicy, sweet, aromatic. Tree vigorous. AM from RHS in 1923.	Eating	PickE early to mid-October. Use January.
Ballyfatten		County Tyrone, Ireland	c. 1740	A large, round apple with firm, dry, sweet, slightly tart white flesh. Excellent keeper. Scab and canker resistant.	Cooking, eating	PickE late September. Use October–November.
Baltimore (a.k.a. Baltimore Pippin)		US	<1860	Width 78 mm (3.1 in), height 62 mm (2.4 in). Stalk 15 mm (0.59 in). Flesh whitish, juicy, subacid.	Eating	Use December–April
Bancroft		Ottawa, Ontario, Canada	Selected 1930. Introduced c.1935	Width 70 – 80 mm. height 55–68 mm. Stalk 15 mm. Parentage Forest x McIntosh. Flesh white, crisp, tender, juicy.	Eating	PickE mid-October. Use November - December.
Banks		Nova Scotia	1880	A red sport from Gravenstein	Eating, cooking, pie	
Barcelona Pearmain		England	<1837	One of the best dessert apples. Cells roundish oblate, axile. The tree is a free grower, but does not attain the largest size.	Eating, cooking	
Bardsey Island Apple		Bardsey Island, Wales	1998	A medium-sized eating apple with a unique lemon aroma. Sweet and juicy. Skin color red over gold. Very disease resistant. Single tree discovered on Bardsey island in 1998, age of original tree unknown. May have monastic origins.	Eating	
Barkley Red Rome				Bud mutation of Rome Beauty.		
Barnack Beauty		Barnack, Northamptonshire, England	c. 1840, introduced c. 1870	Medium-sized apple. Yellow, 25-75% flushed with orange red. AM from RHS in 1899. FCC from RHS in 1909. Width 67 mm (2.6 in), height 58 mm (2.3 in). Stalk 20–25 mm (0.79–0.98 in). Flesh; creamy white, very firm, crisp, fine-textured, juicy, subcaid to sweet.	Eating	PickE late September–early October. Use December–March
Barnack Orange		England	1904	P Barnack Beauty x Cox Orange. Width 76 mm (3.0 in), height 67 mm (2.6 in). Stalk short. Flesh; creamy white, firm, coarse-textured, juicy, subacid, aromatic.	Eating	PickE late September–early October. Use November–February
Baronesa		Brazil	Introduced 1997	P Princesa x Fuji. Weight 130 g (4.6 oz). Flesh sweet, crisp. Tree vigorous.	Eating	
Bascombe Mystery		England	<1831	A late keeping green apple. Width 68 mm, height 56 mm. Stalk short. Flesh pale yellow, fine-textured, juicy, subacid.	Eating	PickE early October. Use November - March
Batul (a.k.a. Batulenka, Batulka, Batul-Alma ru. Batullen)		Romania or Hungary		A green apple with red flush. Russet in stalk cavity. Width 50 mm (2.0 in), height 50 mm (2.0 in), weight 80 g (2.8 oz). Tree vigorous. Flesh acidic with poor aroma.	Eating	PickE mid- to late October. Use December–April.
Baumanns Reinette (cs. Baumanova reneta, fr. Reinette Baumann, pl. Reneta Baumana, ru. Renet Baumana)		Belgium	c. 1810	Medium size. Skin brilliant crimson. Width 66 mm (2.6 in), height 52 mm (2.0 in). Weight 110 g (3.9 oz). Stalk 10–15 mm (0.39–0.59 in). Cells, oblate, axile, open. Flesh; crisp, subacid. First Class Certificate from RHS in 1878. Cold Storage 2 °C 180 days. VitC 16. Density 0.83	Cooking, eating	PickE late September. PickG early October. Use December–March
Baxter's Pearmain		Norfolk, England	1821	A large dual purpose apple. Width 69 mm (2.7 in), height 60 mm (2.4 in). Stalk medium. Cells obovate, axile. The tree is hardy, vigorous, a most abundant bearer. Flesh; pale yellow, coarse-textured, dry, subacid.	Cooking, eating	PickE late September–early October; use November–March
Beach (a.k.a. Apple of Commerce)		Arkansas, US	<1898	A yellow apple with red overcolor, medium size. A late keeper. Stalk medium. Tree large, vigorous. Flesh: very firm, rather dry.	Eating	Pick late October.
Beacon		Minnesota, US	Introduced 1936	Lively, juicy flavor; good for baking. Does not keep very well. Parentage (Malinda x Duchess of Oldenburg)x(Malinda x Tetofsky)	Cooking, eating	PickE early September. Use September–October.
Beauty of Bath (de. Schöner aus Bath)		Bailbrook, Batheston, Somerset, England	Introduced 1864	Width 59–63 mm (2.3–2.5 in), height 44–51 mm (1.7–2.0 in). Stalk 9–12 mm (0.35–0.47 in). Deep red flush and streaks of red with a little russet. Early maturing but short season. Formerly grown commercially in England for local markets. FCC from RHS in 1887. Good flavor in its home climate if it is eaten soon after picking. Poor flavour if distributed long distances and stored for weeks, so now rare. Flesh; creamy white, soft, very juicy, subacid. VitC 14.	Eating	PickE early August; use early August
Beauty of Bedford		Bedfordshire, England	<1913	Width 64 mm (2.5 in), height 64 mm (2.5 in). P Lady Sudely x Beauty of Bath. Greenish yellow with orange flush. Flesh yellow, firm, juicy, sweet.	Eating	PickE mid-September; use September–October
Beauty of Hants		Southampton, Hampshire, England	c. 1850	A yellow apple with orange-red flush. Width 80 mm (3.1 in), height 70 mm (2.8 in). Stalk variable. Flesh very crisp, yellowish juicy, highly aromatic. Triploid.	Eating	PickE late September–early October; use November–February
Beauty of Kent		Kent, England	introduced c.1820	Old culinary apple, very irregular, ribbed. Width 90 mm (3.5 in), height 83 mm (3.3 in). Cells, roundish obovate, abaxile. AM from RHS in 1901. Flesh yellowish, tender, subacid. TRI	Cooking	PickE late September; use December–March
Beauty of Stoke		Nottinghamshire, England	<1889	Width 70 mm, height 65 mm. Flesh yellowish, firm, dry, pleasant flavour. Tree vigorous. FCC from RHS in 1890.	Cooking, eating	PickE mid- to late October. Use January·March
Beauty of Wiltshire (a.k.a. Weisse Wachs Reinette)		?	<1800	Yellow with red flush. Width 65 mm (2.6 in), height 56 mm (2.2 in). Stalk 9 mm (0.35 in). Flesh juicy, very acidic.	Cooking, eating	Use October–November
Bedfordshire Foundling		Bedfordshire, England	c. 1800	A yellow apple slightly flushed with red. An excellent culinary apple. Width 75–89 mm (3.0–3.5 in), height 65–88 mm (2.6–3.5 in). Cells obovate, abaxile. Stalk short. Flesh; creamy white, firm, juicy, subacid.	Cooking	PickE late September–early October; use December–March
Bedrika (a.k.a. Prisatka)		Possibly Serbia		A green conical apple with red flush. Width 77 mm (3.0 in), height 65 mm (2.6 in). Weight 184 g (6.5 oz). Flesh white, sweet, with pleasant aroma.	Eating	
Beefsteak		Amesbury, Massachusetts, US	<1870	Stalk medium. Flesh white, tender, crisp, juicy, subacid. Very good.	Eating	Use October–November
Beeley Pippin		Derbyshire, England	Raisedc. 1880	A yellow apple flushed (25–50%) with red. Width 73 mm (2.9 in), height 62 mm (2.4 in). Stalk short. Flesh yellow, juicy, sweet, aromatic.	Eating	Pick late August; use September–October
Belle de Boskoop (cs. Boskoopské, de. Boskoop, Schöner von Boskoop) agm		Boskoop, Netherlands	1856	Width 73–95 mm (2.9–3.7 in), height 67–87 mm (2.6–3.4 in), weight 205 g (7.2 oz). Stalk 10–25 mm (0.39–0.98 in). Flesh acid and aromatic. Tree vigorous. Particularly attractive blossom. AM from RHS in 1897. VitC 10–17. Density 0.83 TRI	Cooking, baking	PickE early October. PickG mid-October. Pickg September 23–October 15. Use January–April
Belle de Builts		Builts, La Vienne, France	<1860	A yellow apple with red flush. Width 68–74 mm (2.7–2.9 in), height 49–54 mm (1.9–2.1 in). Stalk 17 mm (0.67 in). Flesh white, crisp, juicy, aromatic, sweet.	Cooking, eating	Use January–April
Belle de Pontoise (cs. Pontoiské, de. Schöner aus Pontoise, ru. Pontuazskaia krasvitța)		France	1869, introduced 1879	Large flat-round apple. Greenish-yellow, 25–75% flushed with red. Biennial. Width 86 mm (3.4 in), height 64–67 mm (2.5–2.6 in). Stalk 15–20 mm (0.59–0.79 in). Flesh white, sweet, juicy. Tree vigorous.	Cooking.	PickE mid-October; use November–March
Bellefleur Kitaika (cs. Krasokvět Kitajka, pl. Bellfleur Kitajka)		Russia	1914	Width 100 mm, height 85 mm. Flesh, white, soft, sweet.		Use October - December
Belmont		Pennsylvania, US	<1870	Width 82 mm (3.2 in), height 67 mm (2.6 in). Stalk short to medium. Flesh yellowish, crisp, tender, juicy, aromatic. Very good. Tree vigorous, healthy, very productive.	Eating	Use November–February
Ben Davis (a.k.a. New York Pippin, Victoria Pippin, Victoria Red, Red Pippin, Kentucky Pippin, Baltimore Red, Baltimore Pippin)		Southeastern US	c. 1800	Width 77 mm, height 80mm. Noted for keeping well prior to refrigerated storage, but flavour has been compared with cork.	Eating	Use January - June.
Bennet		Herefordshire, England	<1870	A cider apple.	Cider	
Benoni		Massachusetts, US	<1832	A small orange-yellow apple with red overcolour. Width 57–59 mm (2.2–2.3 in), height 53 mm (2.1 in). Stalk 16 mm (0.63 in). Cells obovate, axile, closed. Flesh yellow, firm, crisp, tender, juicy, subacid, good to very good. BB. DBH 110.	Eating	Pick50 August 23. PickE late August. Use August–September
Ben's Red		Cornwall, England	c. 1830	Medium to large apple. Slightly ribbed. Skin flushed and striped dark red. Flesh pale yellow, sweet, aromatic. P Devonshire Quarrenden Xbox Apple. Award of Merit from RHS in 1899.	Eating	PickE early September; use September.
Bentley Sweet		Virginia, US	<1850	Flesh sweet. Tree vigorous, productive, an early bearer.	Eating	Use April–September
Berlepsch (see Freiherr von Berlepsch)						
Berner Rosen (cs. Bernské růžové)		Zurich, Switzerland	1860	A red apple. Height 57–62 mm (2.2–2.4 in), width 62–66 mm (2.4–2.6 in). Weight 110 g (3.9 oz). Stalk 20 mm (0.79 in). Flesh; soft, juicy, subacid. Cold storage 4 °C 120 days. VitC 11. Density 0.78	Eating	PickG late September–early October; use December–February
Bess Pool		Nottinghamshire, England	1824	Round-conical apple. Flesh firm but tender, white, sweet, rather dry. Trees are shy bearers at first. Width 67–70 mm (2.6–2.8 in), height 58–63 mm (2.3–2.5 in). Stalk 10–15 mm (0.39–0.59 in). Cells ovate, axile, open or abaxile.	Eating	PickE early October; use November–February
Bethlemite		US	<1860	Width 78 mm (3.1 in), height 58 mm (2.3 in). Stalk 13 mm (0.51 in). Flesh juicy, subacid, aromatic.	Eating	Use December–March
Beverly Hills		California, US	1939, Introduced 1945.	P Melba x Early McIntosh. Slightly tart flavor. Flesh white. Likes warm weather. MacIntosh style summer apple that is self fertile and well adapted to low chill conditions.	Eating	
Biesterfelder Renette		Biesterfeld, Lippe, Germany	1850	A yellow apple striped with red. Width 60–75 mm (2.4–3.0 in), height 55–65 mm (2.2–2.6 in). Flesh white, crisp, juicy. Cold storage 2 °C 120 days.	Eating	PickG mid-September. Use October–December
Bietigheimer		Germany	<1870	Fruit very large with russet. Width 110 mm (4.3 in), height 78 mm (3.1 in). Stalk 16 mm (0.63 in). Tree large, vigorous. Flesh white, firm, coarse, srisp, juicy, subacid, fair to good.		Use September–October
Birgit Bonnier		Sweden	1992	A cross between Cortland (apple) and Lord Lambourne.		
Bismarck		Victoria, Australia	1870	Large fruit with a yellow-green with red overcolour. Flesh crisp, juicy, subacid, fair to good. FCC from RHS in 1887. Width 65–85 mm (2.6–3.3 in), height 58–72 mm (2.3–2.8 in). Stalk 12 mm (0.47 in).	Cooking, juice.	PickE late September. Use November–February
Bittenfelder		Baden-Württemberg, Germany	<1940	Flesh; white, crisp, juicy, subacid.	Cider, juice	PickG late October. Use November–April.
Black Annette		US	<1820	Flesh white, tender, good.	Eating	Use November–December
Black Apple		US	<1820	Flesh white, good.	Eating	Use November–February
Black Ben Davis		Arkansas, US	c. 1800	A red mutation of Ben Davis.	Eating	Use January - April.
Black Gilliflower		US	<1800	Width 68 mm (2.7 in), height 74 mm (2.9 in). Stalk 15 mm (0.59 in). Flesh white, dry, subacid, good. Tree very productive.	Eating	Use November–March
Blackjon		Washington, US	Introduced 1931	Mutation of Jonathan. Cold storage 3-4 °C 120 days.	Eating	
Blackmack		British Columbia, Canada	Introduced 1930	Mutation of Red McIntosh.	Eating	
Black Oxford		Maine, US	<1870	Flesh white, dry, subacid, good. Tree a great bearer.	Eating	Use March–May
Black Sweet (a.k.a. Moore's Sweeting)		US	<1820	Width 82 mm (3.2 in), height 67 mm (2.6 in). Stalk 10 mm (0.39 in). Flesh yellow, dry, very sweet. Quality inferior.	Baking, cider	Use December–March
Blairmont		Georgia, US	Cross made 1961	A round to conical apple with 90% red overcolor. Moderately resistant to scab, fire blight, powdery mildew and black rot. DBH 112. Flesh: cream, juicy, subacid.	Eating	
Blauacher Wädenswil		Bern, Switzerland		Width 78 mm (3.1 in). Height 75 mm (3.0 in). Flesh; greenish-white, juicy, subacid.	Cider, juice	PickG late September. Use October.
Bledsoe		Kentucky, US	<1855	A large apple. Stalk short. Flesh crisp, juicy, subacid, good.	Eating	Use September–April
Blenheim Orange (a.k.a. Emilia (in Ecuador), Pennsylvania (in Colombia), cs. Blenheimská reneta, de. Goldrenette von Blenheim, pl. Blenheimska, ru. Renet blengheimskii, Renet zolotoi blengheimskii) agm		England	Discovered c. 1740, introduced c. 1818	Has greenish-yellow to orange skin streaked with red. Width 75–91 mm (3.0–3.6 in), height 60–70 mm (2.4–2.8 in), weight 165 g (5.8 oz). Stalk 10–20 mm (0.39–0.79 in). Cells open, obovate, axile. Flesh; aromatic, juicy. Distinctive nutty flavor excellent for cooking. The vigorous tree is slow to come into crop but then produces heavily. Parentage Golden Reinette x unknown. Cold storage 4 °C 120 days. TRI VitC 13. Density 0.76	Cooking, eating	PickE late September. PickG early October. Use November–January.
Bloody Ploughman		Carse of Gowrie, Scotland	c. 1800	A medium-sized, very dark red, heavily ribbed apple. Flesh white sometimes pink-streaked, crisp, juicy, mildly sweet. It is reputed to have got its name after a gamekeeper shot dead a ploughman caught stealing apples from the Megginch Estate. When his body was returned to his wife, she found stolen apples in his pockets and threw them onto a rubbish heap. One of the resulting seedlings bore apples of a deep, blood red. This tree gave rise to the cultivar that was named after the unfortunate ploughman.	Eating	PickE mid-September. Use September - November.
Blue Pearmain		US	c. 1800	A yellow apple with dark red stripes. Width 70–75 mm (2.8–3.0 in). Height 63–70 mm (2.5–2.8 in). Steam short and stout. FCC from RHS in 1896. Flesh aromatic, spicy, subacid, very good.	Cooking, cider, eating	PickE early October; use November–December.
Blutapfel (a.k.a. Pomme Sanguinole, Purpurapfel)		?	<1820	A yellow apple with red overcolor. Width 49–60 mm, height 45–54 mm. Stalk 6 mm. Flesh yellow tinted with red, juicy subacid.	Eating, Cooking	Pick October. Use December - May.
Bodil Neergaard		Denmark	1855	A green oblong conical apple. Width 56–61 mm (2.2–2.4 in), height 70–75 mm (2.8–3.0 in). Stalk 10 mm (0.39 in). Flesh; white, juicy, spicy.	Eating, cooking	Pick October; use Januar–March
Böhmer (a.k.a. Edel-Böhmer)		Tyrol	<1857	Green with red flush. Width 75 mm (3.0 in), height 55 mm (2.2 in). Stalk 13 mm (0.51 in).	Eating	Use December–March
Böhmischer Rosenapfel		Bohemia, Germany	<1800	A large apple. Width 81 mm (3.2 in), height 56 mm (2.2 in). Stalk 12 mm (0.47 in). Flesh juicy, sweet.	Eating, cooking	Use August–September
Bohnapfel (a.k.a. Grosser Rheinischer Bohnapfel, cs. Strýmka, pl. Grochówka)		Germany	<1800	Width 55 mm (2.2 in), height 55 mm (2.2 in), weight 100 g (3.5 oz). Stalk 10–20 mm (0.39–0.79 in). Flesh; acid, crisp, juicy. Cold storage 2 °C 210 days. Density 0.80 TRI	Cooking, cider	PickG late October–early November; use March–May
Boiken (cs. Boikovo)		Bremen, Germany	1828	Culinary apple. Width 68–82 mm (2.7–3.2 in), height 56–68 mm (2.2–2.7 in). Weight 125 g (4.4 oz). Stalk 17–23 mm (0.67–0.91 in). Flesh white, firm, crisp, tender, juicy, subacid to acid, good. Cold storage 0 °C 150 days. VitC 10. Density 0.85	Cooking, drying, juice	PickE mid-October. PickG mid–late October; use February–May
Bonum (a.k.a. Magnum Bonum)		US	1828	Width 77 mm (3.0 in), height 57 mm (2.2 in). Stalk 20 mm (0.79 in). Flesh white, firm, tender, aromatic, juicy, mild subacid, very good.	Eating	Use September–December
Borgovskoje		Russia	<1860	A sweet yellow apple.	Eating	Pick late August
Borovitsky (see Duchess of Oldenburg)
Borsdorfer see Edelborsdorfer
Börtlinger Weinapfel		Baden-Württemberg, Germany	1827	Flesh; greenish-white, juicy, acid. Tree vigorous.	Cider, juice	PickG mid-October. Use October–November.
Bottle Greening		Green Mountains, US	<1850	Produces large fruit. Has thick skin. Flesh white, subacid.	Eating, cider	Use January–February
Bough (see Sweet Bough)						
Bountiful		Kent, England		Width 76 mm (3.0 in), height 57 mm (2.2 in). Stalk 20 mm (0.79 in). A yellow apple flushed (0–25%) with red. Flesh, fairly juicy, fairly tender.	Cooking, Eating	Pick late September; use September–January
Bow Hill Pippin		Bow Hill, Kent, England	introduced 1893	Golden yellow with slight flush. Width 70 mm (2.8 in), height 60 mm (2.4 in). AM from RHS in 1893. Flesh yellow, firm, juicy, good.	Eating	Use November–February
Brabant Bellefleur(a.k.a. Brabantsche Bellefleur)		France?	<1830	A yellow apple with red flush and stripes. Width 71 mm, height 67 mm. Stalk 10mm. Cells closed, elliptical. AM from RHS in 1901. Flesh crisp, yellow, acid, aromatic.	Cooking	Use December–April
Braddick Nonpareil		England	<1828	A medium-sized roundish apple. Width 66 mm, height 55 mm. Stalk short. Cells, ovate, axile. Flesh yellowish, subacid, aromatic. More sweet and tender than the Old Nonpareil.	Eating	PickE mid October. Use November - April.
Braeburn		New Zealand	introduced 1952	Width 76 mm, height 69 mm. Chance seedling. Flesh pale cream, firm, crisp, juicy. Red overcolor 69%. Ripens 19 days after Golden Delicious. Not susceptible to bitter-pit. The fruit is widely sold commercially in the United Kingdom. Cold Storage 1 °C 180 days. SS 13.8 - 14.7 TA 0.53 - 0.86.	Eating	Pick 45 October 16. Pick55 October 5. Pick at the end of late May in New Zealand.
Bramley (Bramley's Seedling) agm		Nottinghamshire, United Kingdom	1809	Most widely sold cooking apple in the United Kingdom. Triploid. Width 83–86 mm (3.3–3.4 in), height 66–70 mm (2.6–2.8 in). Stalk 10–20 mm (0.39–0.79 in). Cells round, axile, open. Large sized fruits with waxy skin, green with a red flush, which must be peeled before use. A favorite ingredient in many traditional British puddings. TRI	Cooking, juice, cider.	PickE mid-October. Use November–February.
Brasil (a.k.a. Bruckner, Bruckner do Brasil)		Brazil	1940s	Fruit large, resembles Delicious. Tree vigorous.	Eating	
Brauner Matapfel		Germany	<1800	A yellow apple with redbrown flush. Width 65 mm (2.6 in), height 55 mm (2.2 in). Stalk 7 mm (0.28 in). Flesh whitish-yellow, sweet, subacid. Quality cooking good, eating fair.	Cooking	Pick mid-October; use December–May
Bravo de Esmolfe		Esmolfe, Penacova, Portugal	18th century	A small, juicy and sweet apple, considered one of the best Portuguese apples	Eating	
Breakey		Manitoba, Canada	Introduced 1935	Fruit medium size, red and scarlet. Flesh white, melting, juicy, spicy.	Cooking, eating	Use September–November
Breda Reinette (a.k.a. Reinette von Breda, Reinette de Breda, Nelguin, Reinette Nelguin)		Netherlands	<1760	Width 65 mm (2.6 in), height 56 mm (2.2 in). Stalk 7 mm (0.28 in). Flesh yellowish, juicy, aromatic.	Cooking, eating	Use December–March
Breedon Pippin		England	1801	Sweet flavor. Originally raised by a parson in Berkshire. Rare.	Eating	
Brettacher		Brettach, Württemberg, Germany		A yellow apple striped with red. Width 70–85 mm (2.8–3.3 in), height 50–60 mm (2.0–2.4 in). Flesh white, juicy.	Eating	PickG mid–late October. Pickg October 15–30. Use December–May.
Breuhahn(a.k.a. Geheimrat Breuhahn, cs. Breuhahnovo)		Geisenheim, Germany	1895 Introduced 1934	Width 57–63 mm (2.2–2.5 in), height 45–53 mm (1.8–2.1 in), weight 93 g (3.3 oz). Stalk 17–25 mm (0.67–0.98 in). Flesh: yellowish white, juicy, subacid. Cold storage 1 °C 180 days. VitC 8–14. Density 0.74	Cooking, eating	PickG late September–early October; use October–April
Briar Sweet (see Pound Sweet)						
Brina		Italy	1998	Resistant to scab. Spreading habit with intermediate vigor; full flowering season is medium-late, production is heavy, fruit is medium or medium-large, with smooth skin; white lenticels, no russet, excellent taste characteristics. Ripens first week of October (Trentino).	Eating	
Britegold		Ontario, Canada	Introduced 1980	A bright yellow apple. Flesh cream-colored, tender, juicy. Biennial tendency. Resistant to apple scab.	Eating, pie	
Broad Eyed Pippin		England	<1700	A yellow apple with some light brown flush. Width 93 mm (3.7 in), height 70 mm (2.8 in). Stalk short. Cells obovate, axile, open. Flesh white, acid.	Cooking, cider.	PickE late September; use November–January
Brownlee's Russet		Hempstead, Hertfordshire, England	c. 1848	Green with red flush, covered with russet. Width 70–74 mm (2.8–2.9 in), height 58–61 mm (2.3–2.4 in). Stalk 8–12 mm (0.31–0.47 in). Cells pointed ovate, axile, open. Flesh greenish white, juicy, acid, nutty flavour.	Eating	PickE mid-October; use December–March
Buckingham (a.k.a. Kentucky Queen, Lexington Queen)		US, probably southern states	<1817	Width 87–93 mm (3.4–3.7 in), height 67–78 mm (2.6–3.1 in). Stalk 11–21 mm (0.43–0.83 in). Flesh coarse, juicy, subacid, fair to good.	Eating	Use November–February
Buff		US	<1830	Very large. Stalk 19 mm (0.75 in). Flesh, white, tender.	Eating	Use November–March
Bullock		New Jersey, US	<1805	Width 59 mm (2.3 in), height 55 mm (2.2 in). Stalk 23 mm (0.91 in). Flesh firm, crisp, tender, juicy, aromatic, subacid, very good to best. Tree not large.	Eating	Use October–January
Buncombe(a.k.a. Red Winter Pearmain)		US	<1860	A medium to large sized yellow conical apple striped with red. Flesh yellow, juicy, mild subacid, good.	Eating, Cooking	Use December - January
Burchardt's Reinette		Nikita, Crimea	<1860	A roundish-oblate apple. Width 65 mm, height 48 mm. Cells roundish obovate, axile. Flesh white, tender, crisp, juicy.	Eating.	PickE early October. Use November - December.
Bushey Grove		Hertfordshire, England	1897	A greenish-yellow apple with red flush (25–75%). P Alexande x Dumelow. AM from RHS in 1922. Width 78 mm (3.1 in), height 66 mm (2.6 in). Stalk short. Flesh white, juicy, acid.	Cooking, pie	PickE late August–early September; use October–December
Byfleet Seedling		Surrey, England	1915	Large cooking apple; width 96 mm (3.8 in), height 76 mm (3.0 in).	Cooking	PickE early October. Use October–February.
Byford Wonder		Herefordshire, England	<1893	Yellow with russet dots. Very large. Tree very vigorous. AM from RHS in 1893.	Cooking	PickE early October. Use November–December.

=== C ===
Common name	Image	Origin	First developed	Comment	Use	Pick/Use period
Cabashea		New York, US	<1851	A large oblate apple. Width 100 mm (3.9 in), height 68 mm (2.7 in). Stalk 19 mm (0.75 in).	Cooking	Use September–October
Čačanska pozna		Serbia	Introduced 1971	P Starking x Jonathan. Width 79 mm (3.1 in), height 66 mm (2.6 in), weight 200 g (7.1 oz). Stalk medium. Diploid.		Pick late September–early October
Čadel		Serbia	Introduced 1984	P Golden Delicious x Jonathan. Width 78–82 mm (3.1–3.2 in), height 78–82 mm (3.1–3.2 in), weight 250–275 g (8.8–9.7 oz). Stalk 45 mm (1.8 in). Flesh firm, crisp, juicy, acid.		Pick late September–early October
Cal-King		California US	1942	P unknown.		
Calville Blanc d'hiver (cs. Kalvil bílý zimní)		France	<1598	Noted for unusual looks (somewhat lumpy on the side) but excellent reward when tried. Noted for having unusually high vitamin C content. Apple of choice for tarte tatin in France. Width 75 mm (3.0 in), height 65 mm (2.6 in). Stalk variable. Flesh white, juicy, sweet, aromatic. C 32.	Cooking, eating	PickE third week of October; use November–March
Calville Rouge D'Automne (cs. Kalvil červený podzimní, de. Roter Herbst Kalvil, pl. Jablko malinow, ru. Osennii krasnîi kalvil.)		France	1670	A culinary apple of inferior quality in England. Cells ovate, axile.	Cooking, eating	PickE late September. Use October–November.
Calville Rouge D'Ete		France	<1800	A culinary apple of second-rate quality.	Cooking, eating	
Calville Rouge D'Hiver		France	<1800	A culinary apple of second-rate quality. Width 75 mm (3.0 in), height 76 mm (3.0 in). Stalk long. Flesh white, soft, juicy, sweet.	Cider, cooking, eating	Pick early October; use December–March
Calville Saint Sauveur		France	1839	Yellow with red flush. Width 74 mm (2.9 in), height 61–71 mm (2.4–2.8 in). Stalk 12–18 mm (0.47–0.71 in). Cells elliptical or ovate, pointed, abaxile.	Eating	Pick October. Use October–February.
Cambusnethan Pippin		Stirlingshire, Scotland	c. 1750	A yellow apple with red flush (50–75%). Width 70 mm (2.8 in), height 52 mm (2.0 in). Stalk medium. Flesh white, sweet, aromatic.	Eating, cooking	PickE mid- to late September; use October–December
Cameo		Washington State, US	1980s	Width 78 mm, height 70 mm. Existence owed to freak accidental crossing of two most popular apples in world: Red and Golden Delicious. Retains prongs on bottom of latter parent but has flavor more resembling Golden.	Eating	Pick45 October 20. Pick55 October 8.
Campanino		Modena, Italy	Before 1751 (documented)	Fruits have firm, crisp flesh with a rather acid flavor	Cooking	PickE late October. Use January–March.
Campfield (a.k.a. Newark Sweeting)		New Jersey, US	<1817	A cider apple. Biennial.	Cider	Use November–July
Canada Reinette (see Reinette du Canada)
Cannon Pearmain		Possibly North Carolina, US	<1851	A medium size, yellow apple with red flush. Flesh yellow, subacid, very good.	Eating	Use December–March
Capital		Indiana, US	<1850	Width 65 mm (2.6 in), height 57 mm (2.2 in). Stalk 11 mm (0.43 in). Flesh yellow, juicy, subacid.	Eating	Use December–January
Caraway Russet (see Fenouillet Gris)
Carícia		Brazil	Introduced 1995	P Prima x Anna. Flesh subacid, good. Tree vigorous.	Eating	
Cardinal (a.k.a. Kiarolkowski, Peter the Great)		Russia	<1880	AM from RHS in 1896. Flesh soft, white, juicy, sweet, aromatic.	Eating	PickE mid-August. Use August–September
Carlisle Codlin		England	<1830	Yellow apple with no overcolour. Width 65 mm (2.6 in), height 58 mm (2.3 in). Stalk very short. Flesh, white, tender juicy, subacid.	Cooking	PickE early September; use October–November
Carlough		New York, US	<1899	Flesh whitish, tender, juicy, subacid, good.	Eating	Use November–April
Carlton		Geneva, New York, US	Introduced 1923	P Montgomery x Red Astrachan. Ripens 1 month later than Red Astrachan. Flesh white, tender, juicy, subacid. Tree vigorous, annual bearer.		PickE late August. Use August–October.
Carola (a.k.a. Kalco)		Germany	1962	Width 74–85 mm (2.9–3.3 in), height 60 mm (2.4 in), weight 135–220 g (4.8–7.8 oz). Stalk 5–20 mm (0.20–0.79 in). Cold Storage 2 °C 90 days. Density 0.79	Cooking, eating	PickE mid-September; use September–December.
Carolina Red June (a.k.a. Red June, Georgia June)		Tennessee, US	c. 1810	Very popular Civil War-era Southern apple. Flesh juicy, brisk, subacid. Does beautifully in humid weather. Good choice for backyard gardener in subtropical climate, though hardy as far north as zone 5.	Cooking, Eating	Pick late July–early August; use August–October
Carpentin Reinette (a.k.a. Carpentin)		France or Germany	<1800	Gelb with red stripes. Width 59 mm (2.3 in), height 44 mm (1.7 in). Stalk 15 mm (0.59 in).	Cooking.	Use December–March
Carroll		Manitoba, Canada	Selected 1947, introduced 1961.	Resembles a highly colored Melba. Tree dwarfish to medium, winter-hardy.	Eating	Pick late August–early September.
Carswell's Orange		Surrey, England	1938	A yellow apple with red flush (25–75%). P Cox Orange x unknown. Width 67 mm (2.6 in), height 63 mm (2.5 in). Stalk medium. Flesh white, juicy, aromatic.	Eating	Pick mid-September; use September–November
Carter's Blue		Alabama, US	1840s	Medium to large, roundish oblate; skin green or greenish yellow washed with dull red with darker red broken tripes, covered with a heavy bluish bloom. Crisp, juicy, sugary, aromatic, mild subacid. Foliage also has a blue hue. Once widely grown in the American South, then thought extinct. Reintroduced to America in 1994 after being discovered at the National Fruit Trust in Kent, England, where it had been added in 1947 from a collection in Rhone, France, after it had been acquired around 1860 from the Fruitland Nursery in Augusta, Georgia.	Eating, cooking	PickE early October. Use October–February.
Carver (a.k.a. White Carver)		Pa. US	<1875	Stalk short. Flesh yellow, juicy, tender, vinous, subacid. Tree productive.	Eating	Use August
Catline (a.k.a. Gregson Apple)		Maryland, US	<1875	Below medium size. Flesh tender, juicy, sweet. Tree slow growth.	Eating	Use October–December
Catshead		England	<1700	Sharp flavor. Lumpy shape and electric green coloring. Width and height 86 mm (3.4 in). Stalk short. Cells ovate, abaxile. Known to have been a variety planted in early Virginia by settlers as well as native England. Extremely rare in native United Kingdom; occasionally still found growing in southern United States.	Cooking	PickE early October. Use October–January.
Cauley		Mississippi, US	Introduced 1942	P unknown. A large apple. Flesh yellow, crisp, juicy. Tree yields heavily.	Cooking, jelly	
Celestia		Ohio, US	<1850	Width 83 mm (3.3 in), height 75 mm (3.0 in). Stalk 21 mm (0.83 in). Flesh subacid, sprightly, spicy, aromatic.	Cooking, eating	Use September
Cellini		England	<1843	Width 70–86 mm (2.8–3.4 in), height 56–74 mm (2.2–2.9 in). Stalk 10–20 mm (0.39–0.79 in). Cells round to obovate, axile, open. Flesh; white, soft, subacid.	Eating, cooking	PickE mid–late September; use October–December
Chailleux		Bretagne, France	<1870	Width 66–85 mm, height 54–72 mm. Stalk 10mm. Flesh yellowish-white, juicy, subacid.	Eating, cooking, juice	Use November - January
Champagnerrenette (see Reinette de Champagne)
Champion (a.k.a. Shampion, Sampion)		Czechoslovakia	c. 1960, introduced 1976	A greenish yellow apple with red flush. Width 72 mm (2.8 in), height 65 mm (2.6 in). Weight 180 g (6.3 oz). Stalk 40 mm (1.6 in). P Golden Delicious x Cox Orange Pippin. Attractive color. This tree bears attractive fruit, extra-large sized, deep Flesh; creamy white, juicy, and subacid. Keeps fresh for a long time. Starts bearing at a young age. Cold storage 2 °C 120 days. VitC 8.	Eating	PickG early to mid-October. Use October–February.
Champlain		US	<	A grennish yellow apple. Width 83 mm (3.3 in), height 75 mm (3.0 in). Stalk 21 mm (0.83 in). Flesh white, very tender, juicy, subacid. Quality: eating good, cooking excellent.	Eating, cooking	Use August–October
Charden		France		Width 80 mm, height 65 mm. Parentage Golden Delicious x Reinette Clochard. Flesh; subacid. Cold storgage 1 °C 150 days. TRI	Cooking, eating	PickG October. Use November–March.
Charlamoff		Russia	<1880	Yellow with red flush. Tree small. Flesh white, coarse, juicy, subacid, good.	Eating	Pick August; use August
Charlamowsky (see Duchess of Oldenburg)						
Charles Eyre		Berkshire, England	Introduced 1911	A greenish-yellow apple. Width 102 mm (4.0 in), height 90 mm (3.5 in). Stalk short. Flesh white, soft, dry, acid.	Cooking, pie	PickE mid-September; use September–November
Charles Rossagm		Berkshire, England	1890s	FCC from RHS in 1899. Orange to red. Width 80 mm (3.1 in), height 70 mm (2.8 in). Stalk 10 mm (0.39 in). Best cooked early in season. Good flavor, and sweet when eaten later in season. Cold storage 3 °C 90 days.	Multi-purpose	PickE mid-September; use October–December
Chataigner (a.k.a. Martrange, Maltranche Rouge)		Normandie, France	<1400	A green apple with russet and red overcolor (50-70%). Width 72–74 mm (2.8–2.9 in), height 55–67 mm (2.2–2.6 in). Stalk 7–13 mm (0.28–0.51 in). One of the oldest apple varieties in the world.	Cooking, eating, cider.	PickE late October. Use December–April.
Chaxhill Red		Gloucestershire, England	>1873	A roundish oblate red apple. Width 63 mm (2.5 in), height 52 mm (2.0 in). Stalk short and stout. Cells roundish obovate, axile, open. Flesh tender, subacid.	Eating, cider	
Cheddar Cross		Long Ashton, England	Raised 1916, selected 1946, introduced 1949.	Green apple with red flush. Width 60 mm (2.4 in), height 50 mm (2.0 in). P: Allington Pippin x Star of Devon. Flesh yellow, juicy, sharp.	Eating	PickE late August. Use August–September.
Cheese		Pa. US	<1870	Flesh white, tender, subacid. Good. Tree vigorous, bears annually.	Eating	Use November–February
Cheeseborough		US	<1840	One of the largest and one of the poorest of the russet apples. Flesh dry, subacid, sweet.	Cooking	Use November–December
Chelmsford Wonder		Essex, England	c. 1870	A large long keeping yellow-skinned apple with diffuse orange pink flush. FCC from RHS in 1891. Width 75–81 mm (3.0–3.2 in), height 61–68 mm (2.4–2.7 in). Stalk: short and stout. Still grown in Essex orchards including Lathcoats Farm Shop. Flesh; creamy white, firm, tough, fine-textured, juicy, subacid. P Dumelow x ?	Cooking	PickE early October; use November–February
Chenango(a.k.a. Chenango Strawberry)		N.Y. US	<1850	Width 72 mm (2.8 in), height 72 mm (2.8 in). Stalk 14 mm (0.55 in). Flesh white, firm, tender, juicy, mild subacid, aromatic, good to very good. Too soft to ship well. Aggressive grower, overbears.	Eating	Pick45 August 14. PickE early September. Use September–October
Chester (a.k.a. Chester Redstreak)		Pennsylvania, US	<1850	Medium size. Flesh white, tender, juicy, subacid, aromatic.	Eating	Use November–December
Chestnut		Minnesota, US	Introduced 1946	P Wealthy x unknown. Flesh nutlike flavor. Tree vigorous, productive.		
Chieftain		Iowa, US	Raised 1917, introduced 1967	Width 65–80 mm, height 65–75 mm. Stalk 18–35 mm. Flesh white, firm, crisp, juicy, sweet. Cold storage 3-4 °C 120 days.		
Chiver's Delight		Histon, Cambridgeshire, England	1920s	Medium to large oblate apple. Red flush over greenish yellow skin. Width 68 mm (2.7 in), height 59 mm (2.3 in). Stalk long. Flesh; creamy white, firm, fine-textured, juicy, sweet. Flavor can be variable but at its best is very well balanced. Grown by Chivers (now a brand of Premier Foods) for apple sauce.	Multi-purpose	Picke mid-October. Use November–January.
Chorister Boy		Wiltshire, England	<1890	A yellow apple with red flush. Width 66 mm (2.6 in), height 60 mm (2.4 in). Stalk medium. Flesh white, juicy, subacid. Particularly attractive blossom.	Eating	PickE late September–early October; use November–December
Christmas Pearmain		England	1893	A yellow apple with red flush (50–75%). Width 63 mm (2.5 in), height 67 mm (2.6 in). Stalk short. Flesh yellow, crisp, subacid, aromatic.	Eating	PickE early October. Use November–January
Cissy (see Tamplin)
Citron d'Hiver (see Winter Zitronenapfel)
Clarke (a.k.a. Clarke Beauty)		New York, US	<1900	Flesh tender, juicy, subacid.	Eating	Use October–January
Claygate Pearmain		Surrey, England	<1821	Suitable for northerly, cold, wet climates: rich, nutty flavor. FCC from RHS in 1921. Width 67–70 mm (2.6–2.8 in), height 59–67 mm (2.3–2.6 in). Stalk 10–18 mm (0.39–0.71 in). Flesh, crisp, greamy white tinged green, subacid, aromatic. Cells obovate to elliptical, axile. TRI	Eating	PickE early October; use December–February
Clayton		Indiana, US	<1850	Width 84 mm (3.3 in), height 70 mm (2.8 in). Stalk 14 mm (0.55 in). Flesh yellow, subacid.	Cooking	Use November–March
Cleopatra (see Ortley)
Clivia		East Germany	1964	Geheimrat Dr. Oldenburg x Cox's Orange Pippin. Width 64–80 mm (2.5–3.1 in), height 56 mm (2.2 in), weight 100–183 g (3.5–6.5 oz). Stalk 15–30 mm (0.59–1.18 in).Cold storage 2 °C 120 days.	Eating	PickE late September. PickG mid-October. Use October–April
Close		Virginia, US	Selected 1928, Introduced 1938	A greenish-yellow apple with red stripes. Width 65–75 mm (2.6–3.0 in), height 67–72 mm (2.6–2.8 in), TRI	Eating	PickE early August; use August.
Cludius Herbstapfel		Germany	<1860	A green apple. Width 80 mm (3.1 in), height 64 mm (2.5 in). Flesh juicy, subacid.	Eating	PickE mid-September; use September–October.
Cockle Pippin (a.k.a. Nutmeg Pippin, de. Hahnen Pepping)		Surrey, England	c. 1800	A greenish yellow apple. Width 62 mm (2.4 in), height 59 mm (2.3 in). Stalk medium. Cells elliptical, axile, open. Flesh, firm, white, dry, sweet.	Eating	PickE early–mid-October; use December–March.
Coffelt		US		Flesh whitish, firm, tender, juicy, subacid, good.	Eating	Use January–May
Cogswell (a.k.a. Cogswell Pearmain)		Connecticut, US	c. 1755	Width 84 mm (3.3 in), height 63 mm (2.5 in). Stalk 16 mm (0.63 in). Flesh yellow, juicy, subacid, aromatic. Very good to best.	Eating	Use December–March
Collamer		New York, US	c. 1895	A sport of Twenty Ounce. Width 105 mm (4.1 in), height 95 mm (3.7 in). Stalk 17 mm (0.67 in).		
Collins (a.k.a. Apple of Commerce)		Fayetteville, Arkansas, US	1885	Width 78 mm (3.1 in), height 59 mm (2.3 in). Stalk 19 mm (0.75 in). Flesh white, crisp, firm, subacid, fair to good. Tree vigorous.	Eating	PickE late October. Use January–June
Colora Red York (a.k.a. Red York Imperial)		Colora, Cecil County, Maryland	Discovered 1933. Introduced 1935.	A bright red apple. Bud mutation of York Imperial. Assigned to Bountiful Ridge Nurseries, Maryland.		
Colton		Massachusetts, US	c. 1840	A yellow apple. Flesh juicy, mild subacid.	Eating	Use August
Colvert		US	<1850	A large apple. Flesh white, juicy, subacid.	Eating	Use October–November
Conard		Missouri, US	Introduced 1935	P Ben Davis x Jonathan. Ripens one week after Jonathan. Tree vigorous, resistant to disease.	Eating	
Connel Red Fireside		Wisconsin, US	Discovered 1949, Introduced 1957	Bud mutation of Fireside. Fruit red, large. Tree very hardy, productive.		
Constantine		Europe	<1873	Constantine is very similar to Alexander, but ripens later and keeps longer. Width 91 mm (3.6 in), height 69 mm (2.7 in). Stalk 23 mm (0.91 in). Flesh, white, firm, coarse, tender, juicy, subacid, fair to good.	Eating	Use September–November
Cook's Favorite		US	<1850	Flesh yellow, subacid. Stalk long.	Cooking	Use September
Cooper		Connecticut, US	<1796	Width 86 mm (3.4 in), height 65 mm (2.6 in). Stalk 18 mm (0.71 in). Flesh juicy, subacid, vinous, sweet. Good.	Eating	Use October–December
Cooper Early White		Possibly Illinois, US	<1870	Flesh white, crisp.	Eating	Use September–October
Cooper Market		Possibly New Jersey, US	<1804	Width 66 mm, height 59 mm. Flesh white, tender, subacid, fair to good. Tree vigorous.	Eating	Use December–May
Cornell Fancy		Pennsylvania, US	<1870	Stalk medium. Flesh white, tender, crisp, juicy, subacid. Very good. Tree vigorous.	Eating	
Cornish Aromatic		Cornwall, England	very old	Large yellow. High-quality dessert apple. Width 64–77 mm (2.5–3.0 in), height 58–69 mm (2.3–2.7 in). Stalk 18–21 mm (0.71–0.83 in). Cells obovate, axile. Flesh yellowish, firm, crisp, juicy, highly aromatic.	Eating	PickE mid-October; use December–March
Cornish Gilliflower		Cornwall, England	Introduced 1813	Discovered as accidental seedling. Shy bearer. Width 68–70 mm (2.7–2.8 in), height 68–70 mm (2.7–2.8 in). Stalk 18 mm (0.71 in). Cells roundish obovate, axile or abaxile. Partial tip bearer. Flesh yellow, aromatic, sweet. Particularly attractive blossom.	Eating	PickE mid-October; use November–March
Coronation		Sussex, England	1902	A yellow apple with red flush (50–75%). Width 81 mm (3.2 in), height 63 mm (2.5 in). Stalk long. AM from RHS in 1902. Flesh white, soft, dry, sweet.	Cooking, eating	Pick mid-September; use September–December
Cortland		Geneva, New York, US	1899. Introduced 1915.	Width 73 mm (2.9 in), height 57–62 mm (2.2–2.4 in). Classic red coloration, nice crunch. Flesh; white, juicy, crisp. P Ben Davis x McIntosh. Tree early and annual bearer, very hardy. Cold storage 3 °C 90 days.	Eating	Pick45 September 15. Pick55 September 1.
Coryphée		Sint-Truiden, Belgium	2013	Parentage Rubinstep x Nicoter.	eating	Pick early to mid September.
Cosmic Crisp		Washington, United States	Cross made 1997. Became available commercially in 2019.	Width 84 mm (3.3 in), height 79 mm (3.1 in). Stalk 26 mm (1.0 in). Weight 290–300 g (10–11 oz). P Enterprise x Honeycrisp. Flesh: crisp, firm, juicy. SS 12.9–14.6, TA 0.60–0.83.	Eating	Ripens four weeks after Gala.
Cottenham Seedling		Cambridgeshire, England	<1923	P Dumelow x unknown. Width 80 mm (3.1 in), height 67 mm (2.6 in). Stalk short to medium. Flesh white, firm, juicy, acid.	Cooking	PickE late September–early October; use November–March
Coulon's Reinette see Reinette Coulon
Court of Wick		England	<1790	A green apple with red overcolor (0-20%). Width 61 mm, height 54 mm. Stalk 13 mm. Cells roundish elliptical, axile. Flesh yellow, tender, crisp, juicy.	Eating	Pick October. Use October - March.
Court Pendu Plat (fr. Court Pendu Rouge)		France	1613	Extremely old variety, may date from as early as Roman times. Width 61–67 mm (2.4–2.6 in), height 45 mm (1.8 in). Stalk 8–10 mm (0.31–0.39 in). Popular during the Victorian era. Yellow to light green, flushed with red (0–75%). Particularly attractive blossom.	Eating, cooking, baking, drying, juice.	PickE mid-October; use December–April
Cowan's Seedling		England		A small apple, yellow with red flush. Stalk very short. Cells obovate, abaxile. Flesh juicy, sweet, pleasant flavour.	Eating	Use October
Cowarne Quoining		Herefordshire, England	1826	Width 65 mm (2.6 in), height 65 mm (2.6 in). Stalk short and slender. Cells large, symmetrical, obovate, axile, open. Flesh juicy, sweet and of good flavour.	Eating	Use January–March
Cox's Orange Pippin (cs. Coxova reneta, fr. Orange de Cox, pl. Koksa Pomaranczowa, ru. Renet Coxa)		England	1829	One of the most celebrated apples in the United Kingdom, valued for its aromatic "orange" color and flavor. Width 60–89 mm (2.4–3.5 in), height 48–81 mm (1.9–3.2 in), weight 85–100 g (3.0–3.5 oz). Stalk 10–14 mm (0.39–0.55 in).Cells obovate, axile, slit. The fruit is widely sold commercially. Mainly grown in United Kingdom, Belgium and the Netherlands but also grown for export in New Zealand. Cold storage 3 °C 120 days. VitC 5–11. Density 0.85	Eating	Pick45 September 12. PickE late September. PickG late September–mid-October. Pickg September 15–30. Use October–February
Cox Pomona (a.k.a. Pomona)		Buckinghamshire, England	c. 1825	A large five crowned apple. Width 82–88 mm (3.2–3.5 in), height 67 mm (2.6 in). Stalk 14 mm (0.55 in). Cells obovate, axile. Raised by Richard Cox. Parentage Alexander x unknown. Mainly grown in Denmark and Sweden. VitC 12.	Eating, cooking	PickE mid–late September. PickG mid-September. Use October–December.
Cranberry Pippin		New York, US	<1840	Large yellow apple with red flush. Width 80 mm (3.1 in), height 62–68 mm (2.4–2.7 in). Stalk 10–15 mm (0.39–0.59 in). Flesh white, juicy, subacid.	Cooking	Use November–February
Crandall		Urbana, Illinois, US	Cross made 1914. Selected 1925. Introduced 1952	A red apple. Parentage Rome Beauty x Jonathan.	Eating, Cooking	Pick before Winesap. Use February - April.
Crawford (a.k.a. Crawford Keeper)		US	<1850	Flesh yellow, tender, juicy, subacid.	Eating	Use February–April
Crawley Beauty		England or France	<1870, introduced 1906.	A pale green cooking apple. Width 58 mm (2.3 in), height 45 mm (1.8 in). Stalk 15–20 mm (0.59–0.79 in). At maturity yellow with orange-red flush. Award of Merit from Royal Horticultural Society in 1912.	Cooking	PickE mid-October; use December–March
Creek		Pennsylvania, US	<1870	Flesh white, tender, juicy, subacid. Very good. Tree vigorous.	Eating	Use December–March.
Crimson Beauty (a.k.a. Early Red Bird)		Canada	1850-1880s	Flushed and striped with red. Width 64mm. Height 51 mm. Stalk 20 mm. Flesh subacid, soft, juicy, raspberry flower. Tree vigorous.	Eating	PickE early August. Use August.
Crimson Beauty of Bath				Sport of Beauty of Bath	Eating	PickE early August.
Crimson Bramley		Nottinghamshire, England	1913	A red mutation(sport) of Bramley.	Cooking	
Crimson Cox		Herefordshire, England	Discovered 1913, Introduced 1928	Mutation of Cox Orange Pippin. Skin covered with crimson.	Eating	
Crimson Crisp (a.k.a. Co-op 39)		New Jersey, US	Cross made 1971	A greenish-yellow apple with red-purple overcolor (95–100%). Flesh crisp, juicy, subacid. SS 13.5–16.5, TA 0.63, D 76. Stalk 12 mm (0.47 in).	Eating	Pick45 September 15. Pick55 September 5. Use October–December.
Crimson Delight		Washington, United States		Crimson Delight is a multi-purpose apple intended for snacking, baking and fresh recipes. The fruit size is medium to large with a firm texture and is crisp and juicy.	Eating, baking	
Crimson Gold		Czech Republic	1944	A golf ball-sized applecrab hybrid developed by Albert Etter who named it Little Rosybloom for its cute size and attractive ruby red flush. He died before completing the patent papers. Fruit was later rediscovered and renamed. Very crispy and keeps texture in baking.	Eating, baking	Pick45 September 27.
Crimson Newton Wonder		Holywell, Hertfordshire, England	1921	A more highly coloured sport of Newton Wonder.	Eating, Cooking	PickE mid-October. Use November - March
Crimson Pippin synonym of Detroit Red
Crimson Pippin synonym of Scarlet Pippin
Crimson Queening		England	<1831	A greenish-yellow apple flushed (50–75%) crimson. Width 73 mm (2.9 in), height 73 mm (2.9 in). Stalk variable. Cells roundish obovate, axile. Flesh greenish white, soft, sweet, juicy, subacid.	Cooking	PickE early September; use September–October
Crimson Superb		Yorkshire, England	<1950	Sport of Laxton's Superb	Eating	PickE early October
Crimson Topaz see Topaz
Cripps Pink ('Pink Lady')		Australia	1973, selected 1979, introduced 1989	Flesh firm, crisp, very sweet and slightly tart. Light red, pink and light yellow-green striped skin. Width 70–75 mm (2.8–3.0 in). Weight 197 g (6.9 oz). SS 12.5–16.0, TA 0.71–0.91	Cooking, eating	Pick45 October 21. Pick55 October 10.
Cripps Red		Australia	1973			
Crispin (see Mutsu)						
Criterion		New York	1898	One of parents believed to be Ben Davis, but very tart unlike parent. Dark red skin underlain with stripes.	Cooking, eating	
Croncels (cs. Croncelské, fr. Transparente de Croncels, pl. Kronselska, ru. Prozracinoe Kronseliskoe)		Crocels, France	Introduced 1869	Round oblong. Pale milky yellow with occasional slight flush. Flesh pale yellow, tender, very juicy, subacid. Width 80–85 mm (3.1–3.3 in), height 67–73 mm (2.6–2.9 in). Weight 195 g (6.9 oz). Stalk 17 mm (0.67 in). Cold storage 4 °C 60 days. VitC 26. Density 0.72	Eating	PickG late August–mid-September. Use September–October
Cullasaga		North Carolina, US	<1858	Flesh yellow, tender, juicy, sweet flavor.	Eating	Use January–April
Curl Tail		England	<1872	A yellow apple. Width 70 mm (2.8 in), height 62 mm (2.4 in). Stalk short. Cells obovate, abaxile. Flesh is white, soft, dry, subacid.	Cooking	PickE mid-September; use October–December.
Cutler Grieve		Edinburgh, Scotland	Introduced 1912	Width 76 mm (3.0 in), height 64 mm (2.5 in). Stalk 16 mm (0.63 in). Flesh is white, firm, strawberry flavour. Tree is weak.	Eating	PickE mid-September. Use October–November.

=== D ===
Common name	Image	Origin	First developed	Comment	Use	Pick/Use period
Dakota Beauty		South Dakota, US	Introduced 1944			
Damasonrenette see Reinette de Mâcon						
Daniel		Indiana, US	<1850	A delightful dessert apple. Flesh white, fine grained, tender, juicy, subacid, aromatic.	Eating	Use August - September
Danziger Kantapfel (cs. Gdaňský hranáč, fr. Calville de Danzig, pl. Kantowka gdanska, ru. Danțigskoe rebristoe)		Germany	<1760	A yellow apple with red overcolour. Width 63–78 mm (2.5–3.1 in), height 58–63 mm (2.3–2.5 in) Weight 118 g. Flesh yellowish white, subacid, slightly aromatic.	Cooking, eating	PickG September–October. Use October–March
D'Arcy Spice agm		Tolleshunt D'Arcy, Essex, England	1785	A medium-sized apple with yellow-green skin, a red blush where exposed to the sun and covered with a spotty ochre russet. Cells rounish obovate, axile, open. White flesh is aromatic, firm and crisp with noticeable hints of anise and clove. Width 67 mm (2.6 in), height 58–61 mm (2.3–2.4 in). Stalk 12 mm (0.47 in). P Reinette Franche x ?	Eating	PickE late October; use December–April
Davey		Massachusetts, US	Introduced 1950	P McIntosh x unknown. Tree bears earlier and more regularly than Baldwin, resistant to scab.	Eating	
Dayton (a.k.a. Co-op 21)		Urbana, Illinois, US	Cross made 1967. Selected 1976, introduced 1988	A roundish to oblate apple, with red overcolor (up to 90%). Flesh: fine grained, firm, cisp, very good, subacid, 13,3% soluble solids, 0.3% titrable acid. Width 74 mm (2.9 in), height 65 mm (2.6 in). Stalk 18–21 mm (0.71–0.83 in). P N.J. 123249 x PRI 1235–000. Maturity 4 weeks before Delicious.	Eating	Pick55 August 12.
Dazzle		Hastings, New Zealand	cross made 1997	Width 69 mm. A yellow-green apple with 95% red to orange overcolor. Susceptible to scab and powdery mildew.	Eating	ripens midseason.
Deacon Jones		Pennsylvania, US	<1890	Large oblong-conic, ribbed. Yellow with red flush. Tree vigorous. Flesh yellow, firm, coarse, crisp, tender, juicy, mild subacid, aromatic, fair to good.	Eating	Use November–March
Dean's Codlin		Possibly England	<1844	A large apple. Width 91 mm (3.6 in), height 74 mm (2.9 in). Stalk 15 mm (0.59 in). Cells elliptical, abaxile, wide open. Flesh yellowish, tender.	Cooking	Use December–March
De Jaune (see Jaune)
Delawine		Ohio, US	Introduced 1948	P Delicious x Stayman Winesap. Flesh juicy and flavor of Stayman Winesap. Tree strong grower.		
Delblush		France	1979	Tentation delblush, Golden Delicious × Grifer	Eating	
Delcon		Missouri, US	Introduced 1948.	P Conrad x Deliciious. Tree dwarf tendency, heavy producer.	Eating	
Delcorf (a.k.a. Delbarestivale)		France	1960	Parentage Golden Delicious × Stark Jonagrimes. Cold storage 3 °C 50 days.	Eating	PickE early September. Use September–October.
Delfloga		France	2008	Delbardivine delfloga, Royal Gala Tenroy × Florina, scab resistant	Eating	
Delflopion		Delbard, France		Sampion × Florina, scab resistant	Eating	
Delgollune (a.k.a. Delbard Jubilée)		France	1960s	Width 75 mm, height 70–80 mm. Stalk 20 mm. Parentage Golden Delicious x Lundbytorp. Flesh white, crisp, juicy, aromatic, subacid.	Eating, Cooking	PickE mid to late October. Use November - February.
Delrouval		France	1995	Cybèle delrouval, Delcorf × Akane	Eating	
Deltana		France	2010	Delbard Celeste deltana, (Golden Delicious × Grive Rouge) × Florina, scab resistant	Eating	
Democrat 1. (a.k.a. Varick)		New York, US	<1869	A yellow apple striped and splashed with red. Width 77 mm (3.0 in), height 70 mm (2.8 in). Stalk slender,24 mm (0.94 in). Flesh juicy, subacid, very good. Tree is good grower and a great bearer.	Eating	Use December–March
Democrat 2.		Tasmania, Australia	c. 1900	Width 57 mm, height 45 mm. Dark red flush. Flesh: crisp, sweet, juicy. Cold storage 0 °C 150 days.		PickE late October. Use January–March.
Detroit Red (a.k.a. Detroit)		Possibly the US	<1820	Flesh, white, crisp, juicy, subacid. Width 84 mm (3.3 in), height 68 mm (2.7 in). Stalk 10 mm (0.39 in). Good.	Eating	Use October–February
Deutsher Goldpepping (a.k.a. Pomme d'Or d'Allemange)		Germany	<1833	A yellow apple. Width 59 mm (2.3 in), height 47 mm (1.9 in). Stalk 14 mm (0.55 in).	Eating, cooking	Use January–April
Devonshire Quarreden		England, possibly France	1685 (documented)	Possible French parentage or ancestry. Crimson red peel. Juicy. Width 51–64 mm (2.0–2.5 in), height 38–48 mm (1.5–1.9 in). Stalk 15 mm (0.59 in). Cells ovate, axile, split. Flesh greenish-white, crisp, juicy, sweet. Tree heavy cropper on warm soil.	Eating	PickE mid–late August; use late August–early September
Dewdney's Seedling		Lincolnshire, England	c. 1850	Large, irregular, late cooking apple. Flesh juicy, acid. Width 95 mm (3.7 in), height 80 mm (3.1 in). Stalk very short.	Cooking	PickE late August–early September; use October–January
Diamond Jubilee		Kent, England	<1901	A yellow apple. AM from RHS in 1901. Flesh firm, white, good.	Eating, cooking	PickE mid-October. Use January–March
Dietzer Gold-Reinette (a.k.a. Reinette de Dietz)		Germany	<1820	Width 56–67 mm, height 50–54 mm. Stalk 12 mm. Flesh juicy, aromatic, subacid.	Eating, cooking	Use January - April.
Dijkmanszoet				A yellow to green apple with red stripes. Width 75 mm (3.0 in), height 64 mm (2.5 in). Stalk 18 mm (0.71 in).	Cooking	Use November–April
Discovery agm		Essex, England	1949. Introduced 1949.	P Worcester × Beauty of Bath. Width 66 mm (2.6 in), height 48 mm (1.9 in). Stalk 10 mm (0.39 in). Sharp, sweet flavour. Fruits are sold commercially in the United Kingdom. Cold storage 4 °C 30 days.	Eating	PickE mid–late August. PickG mid-August. Pickg August 15–30. Use mid-August–mid-September
Diva		AAFC, Quebec, Canada, Breeder Shahrokh Khanizadeh	2009	Cross between ‘McIntosh’ and 9AR5T17 (test code PRI 674)	Cider and apple cider	late, during the second week of October, in Frelighsburg, Quebec
Diwa (see Junami)
Doctor		Pennsylvania, US	<1817	Flesh tender, juicy, aromatic, subacid. Good.	Eating	Use October–January
Doctor Hogg		England	<1878	A golden yellow apple striped with crimson. Width 83 mm, height 74 mm. Cells obovate, abaxile. Flesh white, tender, juicy. FCC from RHS in 1878.	Cooking (Eating)	Pick early September. Use November - February.
Domine		US	<1831	Width 74 mm (2.9 in), height 56 mm (2.2 in). Stalk 29 mm (1.1 in). Flesh exceedingly tender and juicy.	Eating	Use December–April
Domino		Possibly Nottinghamshire, England	<1883	Oblong, rounded, irregular. Pale yellowish green. Width 64 mm (2.5 in), height 70 mm (2.8 in). Stalk short. Cells elliptical, abaxile. Flesh crisp, acid.	Cooking	PickE mid August. Use August–September.
Domnesc (a.k.a. Pomme de Moldavie, Herrenapfel, ro. Domneşti)		Moldova	<1800	Width 100 mm (3.9 in), height 70–80 mm (2.8–3.1 in), weight 170–210 mm (6.7–8.3 in). Flesh, juicy, sweet sour.	Eating	PickG September. PickE mid-October. Use October–January.
Dorsett Golden		Bahamas	1964	Grown from chance seedling of Golden Delicious. Yellow with red flush (10–40%). Flesh sweet, subacid, good. Tree vigorous. One of the most southerly apples grown in North America.	Eating	PickE mid-October. Use December–January.
Double Red Baldwin		New Hampshire	Discovered 1924. Introduced 1927.	Mutation of Baldwin. Darker red than Baldwin	Eating	
Double Red Delicious (see Starking)						
Double Red Duchess (see Red Duchess)						
Double Red McIntosh (see McIntosh Rogers)						
Double Red Rome Beauty		Washington, US	Discovered 1925, Introduced 1927	Mutation of Rome Beauty.	Eating	
Double Red Wealthy		New York, US	Discovered 1933, Introduced 1940	Dark red mutation of Wealthy.	Eating	
Double Red Willow Twig		Illinois, US	Discovered 1927, Introduced 1929.	Dark red mutation of Willow Twig	Eating	
Dougherty/Red Dougherty		Australia, New Zealand	1930	Red Dougherty is a recent mutation discovered in New Zealand from the old Australian Dougherty.	Eating	
Doux d'Argent		Anjou, France	<1839	A yellow to green apple. Width 78–92 mm (3.1–3.6 in), height 58–72 mm (2.3–2.8 in). Stalk 5–10 mm (0.20–0.39 in).		Use December–January.
Downton Pippin (a.k.a. Elton Pippin, Downton Golden Pippin, Elton Golden Pippin, Knights's Golden Pippin)		Herefordshire, England	1806	A dessert apple of first-rate quality. Width 54 mm (2.1 in), height 44 mm (1.7 in). Cells obovate, axile, slit. Parentage: Orange Pippin x Golden Pippin. Flesh yellowish white, firm, crisp, juicy, aromatic.	Eating	PickE mid-September. Use November–January
Drakenstein		South Africa	Introduced 1981	Round, bright red. P (Wemmershoek x Granny Smith) x Richared Delicious. Tree vigorous.	Eating	
Drap D'Or de Bretagne		Europe	First described in 1628			
Dr. Seelig's Oranje Reinette		Kiel, Germany		A yellow to green apple with no overcolor. Width 73 mm (2.9 in), height 62 mm (2.4 in). Stalk 18 mm (0.71 in).		Use November–January
Dubbele Bellefleur		?	<1760	A green apple striped with red. Width 74–79 mm, height 55–60 mm. Stalk short.		Pick October. Use October–November.
Duchess of Bedford		Bedford, England	<1918	Parentage Cellini x Beauty of Bath. Width 66 mm, height 54 mm. Flesh white, soft, aniseed flavour.	Eating	PickE mid August. Use August–September.
Duchess of Oldenburg (a.k.a. cs. Charlamowski, de. Charlamowsky, fr. Borowinka, Borowitsky, Borowicki, pl. Charlamowska)		Russia	<1824	Has red stripes with splashes of green. Excellent resistance to freezing temperatures. Stalk 8–20 mm (0.31–0.79 in). Width 69–89 mm (2.7–3.5 in), height 57–73 mm (2.2–2.9 in). Weight 144 gram. Cells ovate, axile.	Cooking, eating	Pick45 August 14. Pick55 July 25. Use September–March
Duchess's Favourite		Surrey, England	c. 1800	A yellow apple with red flush. Width 58 mm (2.3 in), height 61 mm (2.4 in). Stalk 12 mm (0.47 in). Cells roundish obovate, axile, open. Flesh yellowish white, tender, juicy, subacid. Tree rather slow in bearing, but then a heavy cropper.	Eating	Pick late August; use August–September
Dudley Winter (a.k.a. Dudley)		Castle Hill, Maine, US	19th century	A medium-sized oblate apple with greenish-yellow skin covered with red stripes over a solid red blush. Width 74 mm (2.9 in), height 60 mm (2.4 in). Stalk 12 mm (0.47 in). Flesh is firm but tender, juicy, aromatic and quite tart, becoming milder as it ages. Good for fresh eating and cooking; rated by many as one of the best for apple pies and sauces. Tree is a natural semi-dwarf, very hardy and bears heavily annually.	Cooking, eating	
Dukat		Czechoslovakia	1965	Width 73–80 mm, height 60–68 mm. Stalk 25 mm. Parentage Golden Delicious x Cox Orange. Cold storage 3 °C 60 days.		
Duke of Devonshire		Lancashire, England	Raised 1835. Introduced 1875	Dessert apple, resistant to scab and canker. Width 61–69 mm (2.4–2.7 in), height 54–56 mm (2.1–2.2 in). Stalk 5 mm (0.20 in).	Eating	PickE early October; use January–March
Dülmener(a.k.a. Dülmener Rosenapfel, Dülmener Herbstrosenapfel)		Germany	1870	Width 83 mm (3.3 in), height 68 mm (2.7 in), weight 195 mm (7.7 in). Stalk 10–16 mm (0.39–0.63 in).Cold storage 3 °C 90 days. VitC 6. Density 0.81	Cooking, eating	PickE mid-September. PickG mid–late September; use September–December
Dummellor's Seedling (a.k.a. Dumelow's Seedling) agm		Shackerstone, Leicestershire, England	<1800	Roundish-oblate apple with pale greenish-yellow skin strewn with large russet dots, occasionally covered with a delicate pinkish-orange blush. Width 77 mm (3.0 in), height 61 mm (2.4 in). Stalk 11–14 mm (0.43–0.55 in). Cells obovate, axile to abaxile. Flesh yellow-tinted white flesh, aromatic, firm, crisp, tart, and very juicy. One of the most widely grown culinary apples of Victorian England, esteemed for its fine flavour and good keeping qualities.	Cooking	PickE mid-October; use November–March
Dungay		England	<1884	An excellent cooking apple. Width 76 mm (3.0 in), height 63 mm (2.5 in). Stalk 25 mm (0.98 in).	Cooking	Use October–December
Dunning		Geneva, New York, US	Raised 1923. Introduced 1938	P Early McIntosh x Cox Orange. Flesh sweet.	Eating	Pick early August. PickE late August. Use August–September.
Dutch Codlin (a.k.a. Chalmers Large, Glory of the West)		Possibly the Netherlands	1783	One of the best kitchen apples. Greenish yellow with red flush. Stalk 25 mm (0.98 in) and thick. Eye small and closed. Flesh white and sub-acid.	Cooking	PickE early September. Use September.
Dutch Mignonne		Holland or Germany	<1766	Medium size round. Width 60–80 mm (2.4–3.1 in), height 55–70 mm (2.2–2.8 in). Cells obovate, axile, open. Flesh, cream, crisp, juicy. Stem long.	Eating, cooking, baking, drying, juice	PickE early October. Use November–April.
Dyer (a.k.a. Pomme Royale)				A yellow apple with brown flush. Width 72 mm (2.8 in), height 60 mm (2.4 in). Stalk 20 mm (0.79 in). Tree vigorous. Flesh yellow, crisp, tender, aromatic, subacid, aromatic, very good to best.	Eating	PickE early September. Use September–October.
Dymock Red		Gloucestershire, England		A roundish or oblate red apple. Width 54 mm (2.1 in), height 41 mm (1.6 in). Stalk very short. Cells ovate, axile, closed. Flesh yellowish, soft, tender, subacid.	Eating, cider	Pick late September

=== E ===
Common name	Image	Origin	First developed	Comment	Use	Pick/Use period
Egle		Lithuania			Eating	
Eady's Magnum		England	c. 1908	Width 91 mm (3.6 in), height 73 mm (2.9 in). Stalk short. Flesh white, juicy, acid.	Cooking	PickE mid-October; use December–March
Early Blaze		US	Introduced 1957	Cold storage 2 °C 60 days		
Early Bough see Sweet Bough
Early Chandler		US	<1875	Stalk short. Flesh yellow, tender, juicy, subacid. Too acid for eating.	Cooking	Use August
Early Cortland		Geneva, New York, US	Cross made 1938, selected 1949	Diameter 75–90 mm (3.0–3.5 in). Skin color 60–95% red. P Cortland x Lodi.	Eating	
Early Harvest (a.k.a. July Pippin, Yellow Harvest, Tart Bough)		US	<1806	Width 58–85 mm (2.3–3.3 in), height 39–70 mm (1.5–2.8 in). Stalk 17–20 mm (0.67–0.79 in). Cells obovate axile, open. Flesh white, crisp, tender, juicy, subacid, good to very good.	Eating	Pick July; use July
Early Joe		New York US	<1843	Width 61 mm (2.4 in), height 46 mm (1.8 in). Stalk 20 mm (0.79 in). Flesh whitish, tender, juicy, vinous flavor, very good to best. Tree is a slow grower.	Eating	Use mid-August–mid-September
Early Julien (a.k.a. Early Julyan)		Scotland	<1800	An excellent culinary apple. The tree is not a large grower. Width 60 mm (2.4 in), height 48 mm (1.9 in). Cells ovate, round or oblate, open or closed. Flesh yellowish, white, crisp, very juicy.	Cooking	PickE August, use August
Early McIntosh		Geneva, New York, US	Introduced 1923	P Yellow Transparent x McIntosh. Flavor excellent.	Eating	Pick early August
Early Nonpareil		Norfolk, England	c. 1780	Width 57 mm (2.2 in), height 45 mm (1.8 in). Cells obovate, axile. Flesh crisp, aromatic, subacid.	Eating	Use October - December.
Early Pennock (a.k.a. Shaker Yellow, Homony)		US	<1800	Width 79 mm (3.1 in), height 70 mm (2.8 in). Stalk 12 mm (0.47 in). Flesh yellow, avid. Quality poor.	Cooking	Use July–August
Early Red Bird see Crimson Beauty
Early Red Juneating see Margaret
Early Ripe		Possibly Pennsylvania, US	<1867	Width 75 mm (3.0 in), height 59 mm (2.3 in). Stalk 15 mm (0.59 in). Flesh white, tender, juicy, subacid. Good. Tree productive.	Eating	
Early Strawberry		New York, US	<1838	Width 58–63 mm (2.3–2.5 in), height 49–52 mm (1.9–2.0 in). Stalk 25–33 mm (0.98–1.30 in). Flesh white, tender, subacid, aromatic, very good.	Eating	Use July–September
Early Victoria (a.k.a. Emneth Early)		Essex, England	1899 (introduced)	Pale yellow fruit. Possibly from Lord Grosvenor × Keswick Codlin. Width 71 mm (2.8 in), height 67 mm (2.6 in). Stalk 18 mm (0.71 in). Flesh; greenish-white, crisp, firm, acid. Cooks well, breaks up completely when cooked. Cold storage 1 °C 60 days.	Cooking, eating	PickE late July–early August. Use August–September.
Easter Orange		England	<1897	Round conical, deep golden yellow with flush and stripes of dark brown red. Flesh firm, yellow, of good flavour. AM from RHS in 1897. Width 66 mm (2.6 in), height 63 mm (2.5 in).	Eating	PickE early October. Use February–April
Ecklinville		Ecklinville, Ireland	c. 1820	Large, round, greenish-yellow. Width 78–87 mm (3.1–3.4 in), height 63–70 mm (2.5–2.8 in). Stalk short. Cells ovate, abaxile. An excellent early cooker. Flesh; white, soft, fine-textured, acid, juicy.	Cooking	PickE early September; use September–October
Ecolette		Wageningen, Netherlands		Flesh: firm, juicy, shap, aromatic. Parentage Elstar x Prima.	Eating	PickE October
Edelborsdorfer (cs. Míšeňské, Mišeň česká, ru. Borsdorfskoe blagorodnoe)		Germany	<1600	A green apple with red flush and russet. Width 70 mm (2.8 in), height 63 mm (2.5 in).	Eating, cooking	PickE mid-October; use December–March
Eden (SJCA38R6A74)		Quebec, Canada	2006	The flesh is juicy, firm, crisp, resistant to bruising. Excellent candidate for fresh fruit slices, fruit salad, dried apple chips, and processing (juice, cider).	A non browning apple for fresh cut/salad	in dry season fruits are susceptible to bitter, Similar yield to ‘Macspur’, Fruit stay on the tree after maturity in Quebec, make it ideal for making Ice cider.
Edelrother			<1856	Yellow with red flush. Width 65 mm (2.6 in), height 61 mm (2.4 in). Stalk 16 mm (0.63 in).	Eating	Use November–January
Edith Hopwood		Essex, England	<1929	Yellow with russet. Stalk very long.	Eating	PickE early September. Use October–November
Edward VIIagm		Worcestershire, England	1908 (introduced)	A large oblate-round apple with yellow-green skin and pinkish-brown blush. Width 76–83 mm (3.0–3.3 in), height 60–70 mm (2.4–2.8 in). Stalk 6 mm (0.24 in). AM from RHS in 1903. Suitable for more northerly, cold, wet climates. Flesh; pale yellow, firm, coarse-textured, juicy, acid. Extraordinary keeper; apple ripens in autumn and will keep until Easter. P Possibly Blenheim Orange × Golden Noble. Cooks well, breaks up completely.	Cooking	PickE mid-October; use December–April
Edwards		North Carolina, US	<1869	A greenish yellow apple, lightly striped with red. Flesh juicy, firm. One of the best keepers.	Eating	PickE mid-October.
Edwin Beckett		England	<1915	Green to yellow with red flush. Width 100 mm (3.9 in), height 114 mm (4.5 in).	Cooking	
Egremont Russet agm		Sussex, England	<1872	Width 64–68 mm (2.5–2.7 in), height 48–57 mm (1.9–2.2 in). Stalk 6–10 mm (0.24–0.39 in). Brown russeting. Excellent keeper. Resistant to scab, very prone to bitter pit. Flesh; cream, firm, fine-textured, dry, nutty flavor.	Eating	PickE late September; use October–December
Eifeler Rambur				A yellow apple striped with red. Width 65–85 mm (2.6–3.3 in), height 50–65 mm (2.0–2.6 in). Flesh crisp, dry, subacid. C 8.	Eating, cooking, baking	Use December–March
Ein Shemer		Israel	1963	P Zabidani × Golden Delicious. Tastes tart, does not do well in cold weather. (Not the same as Anna (apple))	Eating	Ripens in June
Elektra		Germany		Width 68 mm (2.7 in), height 58 mm (2.3 in), weight 95–100 g (3.4–3.5 oz). Stalk 5–15 mm (0.20–0.59 in).	Cooking, eating	PickE early October. PickG mid–late October; use November–February
Elise Rathke		Danzig	<1880	A yellow to green apple, with red overcolor. Width 60 mm, height 52 mm. Stalk 9 mm. Flesh yellowish-white, juicy, subacid, aromatic.	Eating	Pick October. Use December–April.
Ellison's Orange agm		Bracebridge, Lincolnshire, England	Introduced 1911	Width 67–75 mm (2.6–3.0 in), height 57–61 mm (2.2–2.4 in). Stalk 12–35 mm (0.47–1.38 in). P Cox's Orange Pippin × Cellini. AM from RHS in 1911. FCC from RHS in 1917. Rich aniseed flavor. Flesh; creamy white, soft, juicy, subacid, aniseed flavour. Cold storage 4 °C 120 days.	Eating	PickE mid-September; use September–October.
Elstar agm		Netherlands	Cross made 1955	Golden Delicious × Ingrid Marie. Flesh white, firm, good flavor, acid at harvest. Medium-sized, mostly red with yellow showing. Often used in desserts due to its intense honey flavor. Susceptible to powdery mildew and Phytophthora rot. Cold storage 2-3 °C 90 days.	Cooking, eating	PickE early October. Pickg September 23–October 7. Use October–December.
Emneth Early agm		Cambridgeshire, England	<1899	Width 64 mm (2.5 in), height 61 mm (2.4 in). Stalk 23 mm (0.91 in). Suitable for northerly, cold, wet climates. P Hawthornden x Keswick Codlin. A biennial crop that needs thinning. AM from RHS in 1899. Good disease resistance.	Cooking	PickE late July–early August; use July–August
Empire		Geneva, New York, US	Introduced 1966	P McIntosh x Red Delicious.Flesh; white, juicy, subacid. Tangy taste. Ruby red color. Cold storage 2 °C 120 days.	Eating	Pick45 September 25. Pick55 September 10. PickG mid-September. Use October–December.
Empire Red		British Columbia, Canada	Introduced 1942	A red apple. P unknown.	Cooking, eating	
Empress		Geneva, New York, US	Cross made 1969, selected 1977. Introduced 1988	A dark red apple, fair. Width 60–65 mm. P Jonamac x Vista Bella. Flesh light yellow, semifirm, subacid.	Eating, cooking	
Encore		Berkshire, England	1906	Large cooking apple. Width 83–96 mm (3.3–3.8 in), height 73–90 mm (2.9–3.5 in). Stalk 10–15 mm (0.39–0.59 in). First Class Certificate from RHS in 1908. Flesh; creamy white, soft, coarse-textured, juicy, subacid. Excellent cooker.	Cooking	PickE early–mid-October; use December–April
Engelsberger		Germany	1854	A German cider apple. Sugar-acid ratio 10:1. Juice yield 70–75%. Flesh; white, juicy, acid.	Cider, juice	PickG late September. Use late September–early October
English Codlin (a.k.a. Common Codlin, Codlin, Quodlin)		England	<1600	Yellow with red flush and russet. Width 82 mm (3.2 in), height 64 mm (2.5 in). Cells obovate, abaxile. Flesh, tender, white. acid, good. Stalk long.	Cooking	Use August–September
English Russet			<1870	Width 69 mm (2.7 in), height 62 mm (2.4 in). Stalk 13 mm (0.51 in). Flesh yellowish-white, crisp, subacid. Good.	Eating	Use January–May
Enterprise (a.k.a. Co-op 30)		Illinois, US	Selected 1978, introduced 1993	A yellow apple with red overcolor (95%). Width 89 mm (3.5 in), height 76 mm. Overcolor 88%. Stalk short. Flesh firm, crisp, spicy. Stores well up to six months. Makes very good candy apple.	Eating	Pick50 October 20–30. Pick55 October 8–20.
Envy		New Zealand	2009	Sweet and crispy, takes 4–8 hours after cutting to start browning. Royal Gala × Braeburn.	Eating	
Epicure		Bedford, England	1909	Yellowish apple with reddish blush. Good clean taste. Award of Merit from RHS in 1931. Width 63 mm (2.5 in), height 54 mm (2.1 in). Stalk long. Needs thinning for size. Prone to bitter pit, canker.	Eating	PickE mid–late August; use August–September.
Erickson		Minnesota, US	Introduced 1923	A large green apple.		
Eris		Greece	Introduced 2016	A red apple. Width 71 mm (2.8 in), height 73 mm (2.9 in). Stalk 12 mm (0.47 in). Weight 222 g (7.8 oz). Flesh: white-yellowish, juicy, crisp, aromatic. P Black Ben Davis x Red Chief. SS 14.1% TA 0.3%. C 8. DBH 143.	Eating	Pick September 7–13. Use September–April.
Erwin Baur		Germany	1928, introduced 1955	Width 68–80 mm (2.7–3.1 in), height 57 mm (2.2 in), weight 105–212 g (3.7–7.5 oz). Stalk 15–20 mm (0.59–0.79 in). Cold storage 1 °C 120 days. Vit C 7. Density 0.85	Cooking, eating	PickE early October. PickG early–mid-October; use December–March
Esopus Spitzenburg		Esopus, New York, US	c. 1750	Grown by Thomas Jefferson at Monticello. Named for creek near which first seedling found. Heirloom variety still available at farmstands in Northeast and portions of Virginia. Flesh yellow, firm, crisp, juicy, aromatic, subacid, very good to best. Difficult to grow for inexperienced planters. Width 73–77 mm (2.9–3.0 in), height 68–76 mm (2.7–3.0 in). Stalk 19–24 mm (0.75–0.94 in). Cells ovate, axile, slit.	Cooking, eating	PickE early–mid-October. Use December–February
Etter's Gold		California, US	Introduced 1944	Golden yellow. P unknown. Flesh crisp.		Pick October
Eva		Brazil		A yellow apple red striped (70%). P Gala x Anna. Flesh sweet, subacid, good. Tree very productive.	Eating	
Evagil		England	Introduced 1863	A golden yellow apple. Stalk very short. Flesh pale yellow, hard, dry.	Cooking, eating	PickE late August. Use September–October
Evening Party		US	<1860	Width 68 mm (2.7 in), height 52 mm (2.0 in). Stalk 14 mm (0.55 in). Flesh juicy, vinous, aromatic.	Eating	Use December–January
EverCrisp		Indiana, US	2008	Described as Fuji x Honeycrisp	Eating	Pick45 October 10. Pick55 October 3.
Ewalt		Pennsylvania, US	<1850	A large apple, yellow with red flush. Width 75 mm (3.0 in), height 63 mm (2.5 in). Flesh acid, aromatic.	Eating	Use February–April
Exeter Cross		Long Ashton, England	1924, introduced 1952	P Worcester Pearmain x Beauty of Bath. Width 59 mm (2.3 in), height 47 mm (1.9 in). Stalk variable. Flesh crisp, juicy, sweet.	Eating	PickE early August; use August
Exquisite (a.k.a. Laxton Exquisite)		Bedford, England	1902	Award of Merit from RHS in 1926. Width 70 mm (2.8 in), height 67 mm (2.6 in). Stalk short to medium. Flesh sweet, aromatic. P Cox Orange x Cellini.	Eating	PickE late August; use September–October

=== F ===
Common name	Image	Origin	First developed	Comment	Use	Pick/Use period
Fagerö		Sweden	<1860	Width 75–80 mm (3.0–3.1 in), height 68 mm (2.7 in). A red mutant of Grågylling.	Eating	Use October–December
Fallawater (a.k.a. Tulpehocken)		Pennsylvania, US	<1842	Width 88 mm (3.5 in), height 70 mm (2.8 in). Stalk 8 mm (0.31 in). Flesh greenish white, crisp, juicy, mild subacid, good.	Eating	Use November–December
Fall Harvey		US	<1838	Flesh whitish, crisp, juicy, subacid, high flavor.	Eating	PickE mid-September. Use October–December
Fall Jenneting (a.k.a. Fall Jeneting)		Connecticut, US	<1827	Flesh yellow, crisp, tender, juicy, subacid. The tree is a strong grower.	Cooking	Use September–December
Fall Orange		Massachusetts, US	<1848	Pale yellow. Width 85 mm (3.3 in), height 75 mm (3.0 in). Stalk 17 mm (0.67 in). Flesh white, crisp, tender, juicy, subacid, aromatic. A poor shipper. Biennial. Quality: eating excellent, cooking very good.	Eating, cooking	Use September–December
Fall Pippin		US	<1806	Large yellow, roundish to roundish oblate. Width 99 mm (3.9 in), height 86 mm (3.4 in). Stalk 22 mm (0.87 in). Cells obovate, axile. Flesh whitish - yellow, firm, fine, tender, very juicy, subacid, aromatic, very good. AS s. TRI	Eating, cooking	PickE mid-September; use September–December
Fall Russet		US	c1875	Flesh aromatic, good.	Eating	PickE early to mid September. Use September - October.
Fall Swaar (a.k.a. Autumn Swaar)		US	<1800	Width 70 mm (2.8 in), height 58 mm (2.3 in). Stalk 13 mm (0.51 in). Flesh yellow, juicy, mild subacid.	Cooking, eating	Use September
Fall Wine (a.k.a. Ohio Wine, Musk Spice, Sweet Wine)		US	<1800	Width 75 mm (3.0 in), height 56 mm (2.2 in). Stalk 23 mm (0.91 in). Flesh yellowish, juicy, aromatic, mild, subacid, sweet.	Eating	Use September–November
Falstaff		Kent, England	1966, introduced 1989. Red stripes on yellow-green background.|A good pollinator. Width 65–75 mm. Parentage James Grieve x Golden Delicious.	Dessert	PickE early October. Use October–December.	
Fameuse		Canada	<1730	Small apple, very sweet, flavour similar to McIntosh. Flesh white, tender, juicy, subacid, perfumed, very good. Width 60–72 mm (2.4–2.8 in), height 53–56 mm (2.1–2.2 in). Stalk 11–17 mm (0.43–0.67 in). Of no value in Britain.	Eating	Pick45 September 26. PickE late September–early October. Use October–November.
Family		Georgia, US	<1860	Width 78 mm (3.1 in), height 58 mm (2.3 in). Stalk 20 mm (0.79 in). Flesh White, juicy, mild, pleasant, subacid.	Eating	Use August–September
Fanny		Pennsylvania, US	<1869	A bright red fruit of good dessert quality. Width 63 mm (2.5 in), height 50 mm (2.0 in). Roundish slightly oblate. Tree vigorous. Flesh yellow, firm, fine, tender, juicy, mild subacid, good to very good.	Eating	Use September–November
Faurot		Missouri, US	Introduced 1935	P Ben Davis x Jonathan. The tree is disease resistant.		
Fearns Pippin		London, England	<1780	An excellent apple for eating and cooking. The tree is very hardy and a great bearer. Width 64 mm (2.5 in), height 53 mm (2.1 in). Stalk medium. Cells obovate, axile, slit.	Cooking, eating	PickE late September–early October; use November–February
Federal Pearmain (a.k.a. Staaten Parmäne)		England	<1831	Width 70 mm (2.8 in), height 57 mm (2.2 in).Stalk 13 mm. Cells oblate, axile. Yellow red streaked. Flesh vinous.	Eating	Use December - March.
Feltham Beauty		Buckinghamshire, England	<1908	Yellowish-green with red stripes and flush. Width 76 mm (3.0 in), height 70 mm (2.8 in). P Cox Orange x Gladstone. Flesh, crisp, sweet, very good.	Eating	PickE early August. Use August–September
Fenouillet Gris		France	1608	A dessert apple of great excellence. Width 64 mm (2.5 in), height 50 mm (2.0 in). Short stalk.	Eating	PickE mid-October; use November–February
Feuillemorte		France	<1948	Flesh crisp, brisk, juicy.	Eating, juice	PickE late October. Use December - March.
Fiesta agm		Kent, England	Cross made 1971, selected 1979.	Sometimes called Red Pippin. Claims both UK and US heritage: P Cox's Orange x Idared. Width 58 mm (2.3 in), height 51 mm (2.0 in). Stalk 22–30 mm (0.87–1.18 in). Has flavour similar to the former but storage, colouring, and cold tolerance of the latter. Can be susceptible to scab and canker. Cold storage 2 °C 90 days.	Eating	PickE mid–late September; use October–January
Filippa		Denmark	1893	A yellow apple with some red overcolour. Width 63 mm (2.5 in), height 58 mm (2.3 in). Cold storage 1 °C 150 days.	Cooking, eating	PickE mid-September; use September–December
Fillbasket		England	<1875	Name of two different apple cultivars. One from Lancashire and the other from Kent.	Cooking	
Fink (a.k.a. Fink's Seedling)		Ohio, US	<1847	A small apple. Flesh whitish, juicy, subacid good to very good. Good keeping qualities (one year).	Eating	
Finkenwerder Prinz (a.k.a. Finkenwerder Herbstprinz)		Elbinsel, Finkenwerder, Germany	1860	A yellow apple. Width 60–70 mm (2.4–2.8 in), height 60–70 mm (2.4–2.8 in). Flesh; yellow to white, crisp, acid. Cold storage 1 °C 150 days.	Eating, cooking	PickE late October. PickG mid-October. Pickg October 1–20. Use December–March.
Fireside		Excelsior, Minnesota, United States	Selected 1917. Introduced 1943	Very fragrant. Yellow with red striping. Sweet apple, very popular in upper Midwest. Flesh yellowish, coarse, tender, juicy, subacid. Parentage Wealthy x Northwest Greening.	Eating	Pick45 October 1. PickE early October. Use November–April
Fiskhill		New York, US	<1869	Width 70–93 mm (2.8–3.7 in), height 65 mm (2.6 in). Stalk 16 mm (0.63 in). Tree vigorous. Flesh white, firm, coarse, juicy, mild subacid, fair to good.	Eating, cooking	Use November–February
Flake's Fall		Pennsylvania, US	<1869	Yellow with red flush. Width 95 mm (3.7 in), height 73 mm (2.9 in). Stalk 17 mm (0.67 in). Flesh juicy, subacid, aromatic.	Eating	Use October–November
Flame 1.		Boreham, Essex, England	1925	Width 67 mm (2.6 in), height 56 mm (2.2 in). Yellow, striped scarlet. Flesh, sweet, aromatic, subacid.	Eating	PickE late August. Use August–September.
Flamenco (a.k.a. Obelisk)		United Kingdom	1950–1999	A columnar ornamental tree with delicious fruit	Eating	
Flanders Pink see Mariposa
Flandrischer Rambour (fr. Rambour de Flandre)		Belgium	<1800	A yellow apple with red flush. Width 93 mm (3.7 in), height 67 mm (2.6 in). Stalk 13 mm (0.51 in).		Use November–January
Flickäpple		Sweden	<1850	A large cooking apple. Yellow with red stripes. Width 80 mm (3.1 in), height 55 mm (2.2 in).	Cooking	
Florina (a.k.a. Querina)		Angers, France	Introduced 1977	75% Red overcolor on yellow background. Scab resistant. Susceptible to powdery mildew.	Eating	PickE early October. Pickg October 1–20. Use October–December.
Flower of Kent (a.k.a. Isaac Newton)		Kent or Lincolnshire England	<1629	A first-rate kitchen apple from October to January. Width 89 mm (3.5 in), height 70 mm (2.8 in). Stalk short. Cells obovate, abaxile. Flesh crisp, subacid. This is the variety that inspired Sir Isaac Newton to consider gravity.	Cooking	PickE mid-October. Use November–January.
Flushing Spitzenberg		US	<1822	Flesh white, yellow, juicy, crisp, mild, sweet, good.	Eating	Use November–February
Folwell		Minnesota, US	Selected 1913. Introduced 1922	A large apple. Parentage Duchess of Oldenburg x (Alexander x Golden Russet).		
Foote (a.k.a. Foote's Nonpareil)		Mass. US	<1875	Flesh firm, juicy, aromatic, subacid, very good. Tree vigorous, annual bearer.	Eating	Use November
Forge		Sussex, England	<1851	A yellow apple with red Flush. Width 60 mm (2.4 in), height 54 mm (2.1 in). Stalk short. Flesh white, crisp, juicy, aromatic.	Eating	PickE late September; use October–November
Fortune agm (a.k.a. Laxton's Fortune)		England	1904, introduced 1931	Cox's Orange Pippin × Wealthy. First Class Certificate from RHS in 1948. Width 68–75 mm (2.7–3.0 in), height 58–60 mm (2.3–2.4 in). Stalk 20–25 mm (0.79–0.98 in). Prone to canker, good resistance to scab. Tendency to be biennial.	Eating	PickE early September; use September–October
Fortune				Width 91 mm, height 77 mm. Parentage Red Spy x Empire	Eating	Pick 5 days after Golden Delicious
Foundling (a.k.a. Shirley, Groton)		Massachusetts, US	<1820	A medium to large apple. Flesh white, tender, juicy, subacid, aromatic, very good.	Eating	Use September
Fourth of July (a.k.a. Sibirian August, August Apple)		Germany	<1875	Flesh white, juicy, subacid, good. Stalk short. The tree is a strong grower.	Cooking, eating	
Fox Kernel (a.k.a. Sack)		Herefordshire, England		Yellow with red stripes. Width 70 mm (2.8 in), height 70 mm (2.8 in). Stalk long. Cells ovate, axile, closed. Flesh soft, tender, dry, sweet.	Cider	
Foxley		England	c. 1800	Very small. Stalk 25 mm (0.98 in). Raised by Thomas Andrew Knight.	Cider	
Foxwhelp		Herefordshire, England	<1650	Striped red and yellow. Flesh yellow with a rough acid flavour. Width 63 mm (2.5 in), height 63 mm (2.5 in). Stalk 19 mm (0.75 in). Cells, open elliptical, pointed. Flesh yellow, acid.	Cider	
Fraas Sommer-Calvill		Germany	c. 1850	Width 74 mm (2.9 in), height 68 mm (2.7 in). Stalk 15 mm (0.59 in).	Eating	Use September–October
Franklin		Ohio, US	Introduced 1937	P McIntosh x Delicious.	Eating	
Fred Hough		Brazil	Introduced 1994	Small to medium, red striped. Very low acid content. P NJ 76 x Coop 14.	Eating	
Freedom		Geneva, New York, US	Cross made 1958, first fruited 1965, introduced 1983	Yellow with red stripes (80%). Flesh: firm, juicy, crisp, subacid. Width 85 mm (3.3 in), height 69 mm (2.7 in). DBH 143.	Eating, cooking, juice, cider	PickE late September. Use October–December.
French Pippin			<1850	Flesh yellowish, tender, subacid, good. Tree vigorous.	Eating	Use October–January
Freyberg		New Zealand	1934	P Golden Delicius x Cox Orange. Width 65 mm (2.6 in), height 56 mm (2.2 in). Stalk long. Flesh white, juicy, sweet, aromatic.	Eating	Pick early October; use October–December
Freiherr von Berlepsch		Germany	1880	Width 54 mm (2.1 in), height 63 mm (2.5 in). One of the best eating apples. High in Vitamin C. Picking September.	Eating, juice	PickE early October. PickG early–mid-October. Pickg September 23–October 7. Use October–December
Freiherr von Trauttenberg		Germany	<1850	Width 69–71 mm (2.7–2.8 in), height 65–76 mm (2.6–3.0 in). Stalk 10 mm (0.39 in).	Cooking, eating	Use November–February
Friedrich von Baden (see Grossherzog Friedrich von Baden)
Frogmore Prolific		Windsor, England	c. 1865	A yellow apple with red flush. Width 70 mm (2.8 in), height 60 mm (2.4 in). Stalk long. Flesh white, soft, juicy, acid. P Hawthornden x ?	Cooking	PickE late August–early September; use September–November
Frostproof		Virginia, US	Discovered 1930. Introduced 1947.	P unknown. Quality fair. Tree blooms 30 days later than most apples usually do.	Eating	
Frösåker		Sweden	<1900	A yellow apple. Width 58–63 mm (2.3–2.5 in), height 45–50 mm (1.8–2.0 in). Stalk 12 mm (0.47 in).	Eating	Pick October; use November–January
Fuji		Aomori, Japan	1930s, Introduced 1962	P Red Delicious × Ralls Genet. Dark red, conic apple. Sweet, crisp, dense flesh is very mildly flavoured. Keeps very well. One of the most widely grown apple varieties in the world. Cold storage 1 °C 150 days. SS 14.3 - 14.6 TA 0.41 - 0.51.	Eating	Pick 45 October 25. Pick55 October 5. PickE late October. Use December–January.
Fuji Frey		Brazil	Introduced 1995	Bud mutation of Fuji.	Eating	
Fyan		Missouri, US	Introduced 1935	P Ben Davis x Jonathan. Ripens 2 weeks after Jonathan. Tree very vigorous, regular bearer, resistant to disease.	Eating	

=== G ===
Common name	Image	Origin	First developed	Comment	Use	Pick/Use period
Gala		New Zealand	introduced 1960	A small to medium-sized conic apple. Width 61–75 mm (2.4–3.0 in), height 55–65 mm (2.2–2.6 in). Weight 140 g (4.9 oz). Stalk 25–40 mm (0.98–1.57 in). The thin, tannic skin is yellow-green with a red blush overlaid with reddish-orange streaks. Flesh is yellowish-white, crisp, juicy, aromatic, subacid, and grainy with a mild flavour. Cross of three of the world's best known apples: Kidd's Orange Red (a cross of Red Delicious and Cox's Orange Pippin) × Golden Delicious. One of the most widely available commercial fruit. Cold storage 2 °C 150 days. SS 13.2–14.1 TA 0.36–0.54.	Eating	Pick45 August 30. Pick55 August 25. PickE early October. PickG late September–early October. Pickg September 15–30. Use October–January
Galarina		Angers, France, tested and released by AAFC breeding program, Quebec, Canada	Cross made 1978 between Gala and Querina	A round-conic greenish-yellow apple with orange-red overcolor (65–100%) P Gala x Florina. Flesh: yellowish-white, crisp, juicy, firm, aromatic, tart.	Eating	Pick 2 days after Gala
Galbraith Baldwin		Massachusetts, US	Introduced 1948	Mutation of Baldwin. Highly colored.	Eating	
Galícia		Brazil	1987	P Gala x Anna. Flesh crisp, juicy. Tree very productive.	Eating	
Galloway		Scotland	<1871	Large eating and cooking apple. First Class Certificate from RHS in 1871. Width 90 mm (3.5 in), height 71 mm (2.8 in). Stalk 13 mm. Cells, small, obovate, axile. TRI	Eating, cooking	PickE late September; use November–February
Ganges		England		A green kitchen apple. Cells, ellipticale, axile. Flesh yellowish-green, tender, crisp, juicy, subacid.	Cooking	Use October–February
Garden Royal		Sudbury, Massachusetts, US	<1847	A medium-sized roundish-oblate, sometimes slightly conical apple. Width 70 mm (2.8 in), height 57 mm (2.2 in). Stalk 22 mm (0.87 in). Greenish-yellow skin is striped and splashed with bright red, dull or grayish toward the stem; dots few, light and gray; cavity deep, basin shallow, slightly uneven. Flesh yellow, very tender, juicy, rich, mildly subacid and aromatic. Poor keeper. Upright habit, productive bearer, some biennial tendency.	Eating	PickE late August. Use late August–September
Garden Sweet		New England, US	<1875	Stalk short and small. Flesh, yellowish white, tender, juicy, sweet. Tree hardy and productive.	Cooking	Use September–October
Garretson's Early (a.k.a. Somerset Harvest)		New Jersey, US	<1840	Medium size. Stalk short. Flesh white, tender, juicy, subacid, good.	Cooking, eating	Use July–August
Gascoyne's Scarlet (cs. Gascoyneho šarlátové, de. Gascoynes Scharlachroter)		Kent, England	1871	Large red fruit. Width 77–82 mm (3.0–3.2 in), height 63–70 mm (2.5–2.8 in), weight 145 g (5.1 oz). Stalk 15–25 mm (0.59–0.98 in). FCC from RHS in 1887. VitC 8–12. Density 0.79	Eating, cooking	PickE mid–late September. PickG late September; use October–January.
Geflammter Kardinal (cs. Kardinál žíhaný, pl. Kardynalska. ru. Kardinal krasnîi.)		Germany ?	<1800	Width 74–92 mm, height 70–85 mm. Weight 110-240 gram.	Cooking	
Geheimrat Breuhahn (see Breuhahn)
Geheimrat Dr. Oldenburg (cs. Oldenburgovo)		Geisenheim, Germany	Cross made 1897, first fruited 1904.	Width 68 mm (2.7 in), height 60 mm (2.4 in). Flesh: yellowish white, fine, subacid. Created at the Höheren Lehranstalt für Obstbau of Geisenheim in the Rheingau. P Minister von Hammerstein × Baumanns Renette.	Eating	PickE early September. Use September–November.
Gehrers Rambour		Germany	1885	A German cider apple. Sugar-acid-ratio 8:1. Juice yield 75–80%.	Cider	Pick late October
Gelber Richard (fr. Richard Jaune, ru. Riciard jioltîi)		Mecklenburg, Germany	<1830	A yellow apple. Width 66–76 mm (2.6–3.0 in), height 66–70 mm (2.6–2.8 in). Stalk 10 mm (0.39 in). C 23. Flesh: whitish, sweet.	Eating	Pick October; use November–March
Gendreville				A yellow apple with red overcolor. Width 82 mm (3.2 in), height 68 mm (2.7 in). Stalk 15 mm (0.59 in).	Cooking	Use January–May.
Geneva Early		Geneva, New York, US	Cross made 1964, selected 1973	A round-oblate apple. Diameter 70–80 mm (2.8–3.1 in). Skin color 60–100% red. Flesh: subacid, aromatic. P Quinte x Julyred.	Eating	
George Carpenter		Surrey, England	1902	P Blenheim Orange x King of the Pippins. Width 74 mm (2.9 in), height 66 mm (2.6 in). Stalk long. Flkesh white, juicy, sweet, aromatic.	Eating	PickE mid-September; use October–December
George Cave		Essex, England	1923	Pale green-yellow fruit with red flush. Early harvest. Width 57 mm (2.2 in), height 51 mm (2.0 in). Stalk 15–20 mm (0.59–0.79 in).	Eating	PickE early–mid-August; use August
George Neal		Kent, England	1904	Pale green to yellow colour, will keep nicely until late autumn. Award of Merit from RHS in 1923. Width 82 mm (3.2 in), height 63 mm (2.5 in). Stalk 10–20 mm (0.39–0.79 in). Good regular crops.	Cooking	Pick late August–early September; use August–September.
Gerlinde		Ahrensburg, Germany			Eating	Pick mid to late August.
Gestreifter Herbst-Calvill			<1670	Gelb with red flush. Width 67 mm (2.6 in), height 69 mm (2.7 in), stalk 12 mm (0.47 in).	Cooking, eating	Use November–January
Gestreifter Winter-Calvill		Germany	<1840	Yellow with red stripes. Width 70 mm (2.8 in), height 60 mm (2.4 in).	Eating, cooking	Pick October; use November–February
Gewürzluiken		Württemberg, Germany	<1850	A yellow apple striped with red. Width 76 mm (3.0 in), height 59 mm (2.3 in). Stalk 13 mm (0.51 in). Flesh: white, crisp, juicy, acid.	Cooking, juice, baking, eating	PickE mid-October. PickG mid–late October. Pickg October 15–30. Use December–March.
Gideon		Minnesota, US	c. 1880	Tree vigorous. Flesh yellow, soft, coarse, crisp, juicy, subacid, fair to good.	Eating	Use October
Gilpin (a.k.a. Carthouse, Little Red Romanite)		Virginia, US	<1850	Width 80 mm (3.1 in), height 70 mm (2.8 in). Stalk 17 mm (0.67 in). Flesh greenish-yellow, sweet, juicy.	Cider, eating	Pick October; use December–May.
Ginger Gold		Virginia, US	1960s	A yellow apple with 6% red flush. Width 80 mm, height 73 mm. Tangy flavour, crunchy texture.	Cooking, eating	Pick45 September 3. Pick55 August 20. Use September–October.
Gipsy King		England	<1872	A handsome dessert apple. Width 64 mm (2.5 in), height 45 mm (1.8 in). Stalk 12 mm (0.47 in). Cells obovate, axile, slit. Flesh yellowish, tender, juicy.	Eating	PickE mid-October. Use October–December
Gladstone		England	1780, introduced 1868	Width 63–79 mm (2.5–3.1 in), height 54–62 mm (2.1–2.4 in). Stalk 9–17 mm (0.35–0.67 in). A red apple.	Eating	PickE late July–early August; use July–August
Glanz Reinette		Possibly Germany	<1850	A green apple with red stripes. Width 58 mm (2.3 in), height 50–53 mm (2.0–2.1 in). Stalk 14 mm (0.55 in).	Eating	Pick October
Glockenapfel (a.k.a. Weisser Glockenapfel)		Switzerland	17th century	A medium-sized green-yellow elongate bell-shaped apple, sometimes takes on a reddish blush. Width 55–75 mm (2.2–3.0 in), height 60–70 mm (2.4–2.8 in). VitC 9. Flesh; tart, crisp and juicy. Stores well, taste improves with age. Excellent culinary variety; renowned for its use in Strudel.	Cooking, eating	PickE mid-October. PickG late October. Pickg October 15–30. Use December–April.
Gloria Mundi (a.k.a. Pound)		US	<1804	An excellent green culinary apple. Width 89 mm (3.5 in), height 76 mm (3.0 in). Stalk short. Flesh yellow, coarse, crisp, tender, juicy, mild subacid, fair to good.	Cooking	Pick mid-October; use October–December
Glorie van Holland		Netherlands	c. 1890	A yellow apple striped with red. Width 85 mm. Stalk long. Flesh slightly acidic, slightly sweet.	Eating	PickE early October. Use October–January.
Glory of the West (a.k.a. Englischer Prahlrambour)		England	<1800	A culinary apple of first quality. Width 82 mm (3.2 in), height 72 mm (2.8 in).	Cooking	Pick October; use October–December
Gloster (a.k.a. Gloster 69)		Jork, Germany	1951 Introduced 1969	Conical shape. Somewhat tart, ruby red color like parent Red Delicious. P Glockenapfel x Richared Delicious. Good choice for backyard gardening. Width 65–90 mm (2.6–3.5 in), height 65–90 mm (2.6–3.5 in). Weight 150–300 g (5.3–10.6 oz). Stalk 11–23 mm (0.43–0.91 in).	Eating	PickE late October. PickG mid–late October. Pickg October 10–30. Use November–March
Godfrey		Manitoba, Canada	Introduced 1931	P Patten Greening x unknown. A dark red apple. Flesh white, crisp, sweet. Tree vigorous.		Use October–February
Gogar Pippin (a.k.a. Stone Pippin)		Scotland	<1850	A dessert apple of second rate quality.	Eating	Use January–March
Gold Chief (a.k.a. Gold Pink)		Bologna, Italy	Selected 1989. Introduced 1998.	A yellow apple with pink blush (10–20%). Flesh; firm, juicy, subacid.	Eating	Pick 7–10 days after Golden Delicious.
Golden Ball		Connecticut, US	<1880	A large apple. Flesh crisp, tender, subacid.	Eating	Use December–March
Golden Delicious(de. Gelber Köstlicher, ru. Zolotoe prevoshodnoe)		Clay County, West Virginia, US	1891. Introduced 1914.	One of the most popular varieties in the world. Due to its regular size, even colour and storage qualities the fruit is widely sold commercially. Uniform light green-yellow coloration. Flesh firm, crisp, tender, juicy, mild subacid, aromatic, very good to best. A good pollinator. Width 63–72 mm (2.5–2.8 in), height 58–62 mm (2.3–2.4 in), weight 145 g (5.1 oz). Stalk 20–30 mm (0.79–1.18 in). Cold storage 0.5^{o} C 120 days. DBH 137–151. VitC 6–9. Density 0.79	Eating, cooking	Pick45 October 7. Pick55 September 15. PickE lateOctober. PickG early–late October. Pickg September 23–October 15. Use October–May.
Golden Harvey (a.k.a. Brandy Apple)		England	<1821	A yellow apple with russet. Width 49 mm (1.9 in), height 52 mm (2.0 in). Stalk 13 mm. Cells obovate, axile, closed. One of the richest and most excellent dessert apples, it is also one of the best for cider.	Eating, cider	PickE mid-October. Use December–May
Golden Knob (a.k.a. Old Lady, Old Maid)		England	<1850	Orange-brown with russet. A good late keeping dessert apple. Flesh firm, subacid, good. Leaf large, very dark. Width 42 mm (1.7 in), height 35 mm (1.4 in). Stalk short. Cells obovate, axile, closed. The tree is a strong grower.	Eating	PickE mid-October. Use December–March
Golden Lasa		Trentino, Italy		A scab resistant apple	Eating	Pick late September
Golden Mira		Trentino, Italy		A scab and mildew-resistant apple.	Eating	Pick early October
Golden Monday		England	<1850	A kitchen apple. Flesh sugary, briskly flavoured.	Cooking	Use October–December
Golden Noble (de. Gelber Edelapfel) agm		England	1820	Tree is short and stocky. Produces mint green fruit with blush of pink. Width 60–90 mm (2.4–3.5 in), height 50–80 mm (2.0–3.1 in), weight 150–250 g (5.3–8.8 oz). Stalk 5–15 mm (0.20–0.59 in). Cells obovate, abaxile. Good disease resistance. VitC 25.	Cooking, pie, eating	PickE early October. PickG mid-September; use October–January
Golden Nonpareil		England	<1850	A first rate dessert apple. Cells ovate or roundish ovate, axile, open. Flesh juicy, sugary with a rich flavour.	Eating	Use December–February
Golden Orange		Trentino, Italy	1979, released 1996	PRI 1956-6 × Ed Gould Golden. Resistant to scab. Moderate vigour, spreading habit and medium-late blooming season; fruit is moderately large (207 g (7.3 oz)) and symmetric, skin is smooth, no russeting. Ripens some days after Golden Delicious; fruit is very attractive; large, good storage ability.	Eating	Pick early October
Golden Pippin		England	<1629	A golden yellow apple with russet. Width 57–63 mm., height 52–59 mm. Stalk 12–25 mm. Cells ovate, pointed, axile, closed. Eye small and open. Flesh yellow, firm, crisp, juicy, sweet, subacid.	Eating	PickE early October. Use November- April
Golden Reinette (see Orleans Reinette)
Golden Russet		New York	1845 (documented)	A medium-sized heavily russeted light green apple, occasionally with a reddish blush. Width 73 mm (2.9 in), height 72 mm (2.8 in). Stalk 12 mm (0.47 in). Cells obovate, axile, closed. Crisp, fine-grained flesh is rich, sugary and very sweet. Excellent dessert apple, keeps very well. Makes extraordinary cider, known as the "Champagne of cider apples."	Cider, cooking, eating	PickE early–mid-October. Use December–April
Golden Spire		Lancashire, England	1850	A golden yellow apple. An old Northern English variety. Flesh pale yellow, juicy, soft. P Keswick Codlin x Manks Codlin. Width 64 mm, height 82 mm. Cells elliptical, abaxile. Unusually tall and oblong with a tart flavour.	Cooking, cider, eating	PickE early September. Use September–October.
Golden Supreme		Idaho, US	1960		Eating	Pick45 September 15. Pick55 September 8.
Golden Sweet(fr. Northern Sweet)		Connecticut, US	<1832	Width 76–79 mm (3.0–3.1 in), height 59–63 mm (2.3–2.5 in). Stalk 23–30 mm (0.91–1.18 in). A yellow apple. Flesh is yellow, firm, tender, juicy, very sweet, aromatic, good to very good. BB.	Eating	Use August–September
Gold Pink (see Gold Chief)
Goldrush		Indiana, US	1980, introduced 1993	Width 74 mm, height 69 mm. The fruit has a complex spicy flavor with high acidity and sweetness. Acidity moderates in cold storage, with exceptional quality after 2 to 3 months. Parentage Golden Delicious x Coop 17.	Eating	Pick55 October 19.
Goldspur		US	1960	A sport of 'Golden Delicious'.	Eating	
Goldstar		Czech Republic		Eating	Pick October	
Goodwood Pippin		Goodwood, Sussex, England	<1896	Yellow striped with red. Round to conical. The stalk is set in a narrow, rather deep russety cavity. Width 82 mm (3.2 in), height 82 mm (3.2 in). AM from RHS in 1896.	Cooking	
Goosebery Pippin (Ronalds')		Cheshire, England	<1875	A very excellent dessert apple; ripe in November. Small fruit, small tree.	Eating	
Gordon		Whittier, California, United States	Introduced 1977	A low chill hour cultivar developed by Robert B. Gordon in Whittier, CA from unknown parentage. Blooms over long period in Southern California – from April to early June. Bears mature fruit from August to October. Fruit is green with red striped overcolor. Ripe at approximately 50% red coverage. Flesh: white, crisp, juicy. Fruit is dual purpose, for eating and baking with sweet-tart flavor.	Eating, cooking	
Gradirose		Languedoc-Roussillon, France	2004	Created by Pépinières Grard. Early dessert apple with pink blush. Stores well. Very productive.	Eating	Ripens in September
Gragg (a.k.a. Red Gragg or Winter Queen)		North Carolina, US	1860	Originated on the farm of James Gragg in Caldwell County, North Carolina about 1860. Valued by North Carolina growers for its fine cooking qualities, crispness and long storage ability. The conical shaped fruit is red in colour with moderately conspicuous dots. Keeps well.	Cooking, eating	Ripens in October
Grågylling		Europe	<1800	Width 64–68 mm (2.5–2.7 in), height 54–60 mm (2.1–2.4 in). Stalk 12–20 mm (0.47–0.79 in). Flesh juicy, subacid, fair to good.	Eating, cooking	Pick early October; use November–January
Grahams Royal Jubilee (see Royal Jubilee)
Granges Pearmain		Middlesex, England	<1829	Rather large, round, a little flattened. Colour yellow with dull red flush and broken stripes. Width 80 mm, height 55-60mm. Cells obovate, axile, open. Flesh pale yellow, very crisp and juicy and excellent flavour.	Cooking, eating	PickE early October. Use December–May
Granny Smith		Australia	1868	This is the apple once used to represent Apple Records. Width 64–74 mm (2.5–2.9 in), height 61–68 mm (2.4–2.7 in). Stalk 17–25 mm (0.67–0.98 in). A favourite variety, widely sold in the UK. Also noted as common pie apple. Lime green colouring. Extremely tart. SS 11.5, TA 1.03.	Cooking, eating	Pick 45 October 15. Pick55 October 23. PickKt mid-October; use January–April
Grantonian		Nottingham, England	<1883	Yellowish-green with brown flush. Width 76 mm (3.0 in), height 64 mm (2.5 in). Flesh firm, subacid. FCC from RHS in 1883.	Cooking	Use until March
Graue Herbst Reinette			<1800	Width 84–95 mm (3.3–3.7 in), height 64–72 mm (2.5–2.8 in). Stalk 14 mm (0.55 in).	Cooking, eating	PickE early October. Use November–December
Graue Portugiesische Reinette		Portugal	<1798	Width 65–69 mm (2.6–2.7 in), height 46–50 mm (1.8–2.0 in). Stalk 14 mm (0.55 in).	Cooking, eating	Use December–April
Grauer Kurzstiel		France	<1794	Width 69 mm (2.7 in), height 52 mm (2.0 in). Stalk 8 mm (0.31 in).	Cooking, eating	Use December–April
Gravenstein (cs. Grávštýnské, pl. Grafsztynek Prawdziwy, ru. Grafensteinskoe)		Gråsten, Jutland, Denmark	<1800	An early yellow-green apple, often with red stripes. Width 73–91 mm (2.9–3.6 in), height 61–89 mm (2.4–3.5 in). Weight 130 g (4.6 oz). Stalk 10–25 mm (0.39–0.98 in). Cells round to elliptical, abaxile. Tree large, vigorous. Flesh yellow, firm, fine, crisp, juicy, aromatic, subacid, very good to best. Exceptional cooking apple, especially for applesauce and pies. Poor keeper; becomes soft quickly. German immigrants introduced this variety to California's San Joaquin Valley in the mid-19th century. Has many sports. VitC 8. Density 0.82 TRI	Cooking, eating, pie	Pick45 August 23. PickE early September. PickG late August–mid-September. Pickg September 1–7. Use September–December.
Gravensteiner Roter (cs. Grávštýnské červené, fr. Gravenstein Rouge)		Lübeck, Germany	1858	A red sport (mutant) of Gravenstein. Widely spread in Germany, Denmark and Sweden.		
Green Cheese		North Carolina or Georgia, US	18th century	A very old southern apple thought to have originated in North Carolina or Georgia but its true origin is uncertain. The fruit is oblate to oblique in shape. Width 76 mm (3.0 in), height 55 mm (2.2 in). The skin is deep green in colour, turning pale yellow when fully ripe. The yellowish flesh is sweet, crisp, tender and juicy.	Eating	
Greendale		Geneva, New York, US	Introduced 1938	P McIntosh x Lodi. A green apple.	Eating, cooking	
Green Newtown (see Newtown Pippin)						
Green Seek No Further		L.I. US	<1855	Flesh white, crisp, tender, juicy, subacid, very good. Stalk short. Tree slow in growth.	Eating	Use October–January
Greensleeves agm		Kent, England	1966	Golden Delicious × James Grieve; good garden apple, with a pleasant but unexceptional flavour. Width 64–67 mm (2.5–2.6 in), height 57–60 mm (2.2–2.4 in). Stalk 20–22 mm (0.79–0.87 in). Likely named for famous Renaissance-era song. Can be susceptible to scab.	Eating	PickE late September; use September–November
Greenup's Pippin (a.k.a. Yorkshire Beauty, Greenup's Apfel)		Yorkshire, England	<1800	A first rate early culinary apple. Flesh tender, juicy, and with an agreeable acidity. Width 60–77 mm (2.4–3.0 in), height 46–74 mm (1.8–2.9 in). Cells elliptical, axile.	Eating, cooking	PickE mid-September. Use October–December
Grenadier agm		England	1862 (documented)	Possibly one of the strangest of all British apples: it is ribbed and lumpy with a tough coat, looking as though it has taken a beating. Width 83 mm (3.3 in), height 63 mm (2.5 in). Stalk 10–12 mm (0.39–0.47 in). Cells elliptical, abaxile, wide open. Grenadier cooks down to cream-coloured puree with a superb apple flavour. Makes an excellent apple jam. Poor keeper. Reliably heavy annual bearer. First Class Certificate from RHS in 1883. Good disease resistance.	Cooking	PickE mid-August; use August–October
Grimes Golden (a.k.a. Grimes Golden Pippin)		Brooke County, West Virginia, US	1804	A medium-sized roundish to slightly oblong apple. Width 74 mm (2.9 in), height 63 mm (2.5 in). Stalk 23 mm (0.91 in). Greenish-yellow skin, ripening to a clear yellow, stem cavity sometimes russeted, covered with yellow or russet dots. The yellowish-white flesh is crisp and tender, with a rich, spicy, sugary-sweet flavour. A good all-purpose dessert and cooking apple, Grimes also makes a strong single-variety cider. Excellent keeper. Grimes Golden is the parent of the ubiquitous Golden Delicious. Relatively rare among apples, Grimes Golden is self-fertile. Original tree discovered near a known orchard of John Chapman (Johnny Appleseed). DBH 147.	Cider, cooking, eating	Pick55 September 5. PickE mid-October. Use December–March
Groninger Kroon		Netherlands	1875	A yellow conical apple striped with red. Width 72 mm, height 70 mm. Stalk 25 mm. Flesh crisp, subacid, aromatic.	Eating	Use November - January.
Gronsvelder Klumpke		Netherlands		A green apple with red overcolor (80–90%) and russet. Width 68 mm (2.7 in), height 72 mm (2.8 in). Stalk 15 mm (0.59 in).		Use November–April.
Grosh		Pennsylvania, US	<1855	Flesh white, loose, soft, juicy, aromatic, subacid, good to very good. Tree vigorous, an annual bearer.	Cooking	Use September–January
Gros Locard		France	<1849	A yellow or green apple with russet. Width 105 mm (4.1 in), height 80 mm (3.1 in). Stalk 15 mm (0.59 in).	Cooking, juice	PickE late October. Use December–March.
Groẞherzog Friedrich von Baden		Germany	1894	A green apple. Width 83 mm (3.3 in), height 66 mm (2.6 in). Stalk 13 mm (0.51 in).	Eating	Use October
Grove		Missouri, US	Introduced 1935	P Ingram x Delicious. Tree blooms late, resistant to scab.		
Grüner Stettiner (a.k.a. Grüner Winterstettiner)		Germany or Poland	<1800	A green apple. Width 75 mm (3.0 in), height 55 mm (2.2 in). Stalk 11–15 mm (0.43–0.59 in). Flesh whitish-yellow, juicy, subacid. Quality good.	Cooking, drying, juice	Pick October. Use January–April
Guelph		Berkshire, England	<1912	Medium to large sized apple for use in October to December. First Class Certificate from RHS in 1913.	Eating	PickE early September. Use September–November.
Guldborg		Denmark	1870	A green apple striped with red(25% overcolor). Width 68mm, height 65 mm. Stalk 12mm. Flesh white, juicy, subacid, aromatic. P Maglemer x unknown.	Eating	Pick late August. Use August - September.
Gunilla Bohuslän		Sweden	<1900	Width 98 mm (3.9 in), height 98 mm (3.9 in). Stalk 21 mm (0.83 in).	Eating, cooking	Use October–March

=== H ===
Common name	Image	Origin	First developed	Comment	Use	Pick/Use period
Haas (a.k.a. Fall Queen)		Missouri, US	<1875	Fruit oblate-conic, ribbed, yellow with red flush. Tree large, vigorous. Width 86 mm (3.4 in), height 63 mm (2.5 in). Stalk 20 mm (0.79 in). Flesh white, juicy, aromatic, subacid, poor.		Use October–November
Hagloe		New Jersey, US	<1817	Stalk short. Tree healthy, vigorous, productive. Flesh whitish, juicy, acid.	Cooking	Use August
Halberstädter Jungfernapfel		Halberstädter, Germany	<1885	Width 80 mm (3.1 in), height 74–80 mm (2.9–3.1 in). Stalk 12–20 mm (0.47–0.79 in). Flesh juicy, sweet, very good.	Cooking, caking, eating	PickE mid-September. Use November–February
Hambledon Deux Ans		Hampshire, England	c. 1750	A yellow apple with red flush. Width 78 mm (3.1 in), height 64–67 mm (2.5–2.6 in). Stalk 10–15 mm (0.39–0.59 in). Cells obovate, abaxile, wide open. Flesh white-yellow, dry, sweet, subacid, aromatic. Prone to bitter pit. TRI	Eating	PickE late September–early October; use November–April
Hammerstein (a.k.a. Minister von Hammerstein, cs. Hammersteinovo)		Germany	1895	Width 60–85 mm (2.4–3.3 in), height 50–65 mm (2.0–2.6 in), weight 100–180 g (3.5–6.3 oz). Stalk 15–25 mm (0.59–0.98 in). VitC 5.	Cooking, eating	PickE early October. PickG late October–early November; use January–April
Hampus		Holland or Sweden	<1820	Width 66–70 mm (2.6–2.8 in), height 47–50 mm (1.9–2.0 in). Stalk 19–26 mm (0.75–1.02 in). Flesh juicy, sweet.	Eating	Pick late August–early September
Hanaskogsäpple		Sweden	1873	A yellow apple. Width 61 mm (2.4 in), height 54 mm (2.1 in).	Eating	Pick September; use September
Haralson		Minnesota, US	Introduced 1923	P Malinda x Wealthy. Red colour and large, moderately conspicuous dots. Crisp and juicy with a tart flavour. Excellent choice for pies.	Cooking, eating, cider	Pick45 September 3. Pick55 August 27.
Harberts Renette (a.k.a. Harbert, Harbert's Reinette, Harbert's reinettenartiger Rambour, fr. Reinette Harbert)		Germany	<1820	Yellow with red flush. Width 87 mm (3.4 in), height 67–78 mm (2.6–3.1 in). Stalk 15–20 mm (0.59–0.79 in). Flesh is crisp, juicy, subacid. VitC 21. A seedling from Golden Renette. TRI	Eating, cooking, baking, drying, juice.	PickE early October. PickG early October; use December–January
Harrison (a.k.a. Harrison Cider)		New Jersey, US	1770	Yellow skin, sometimes red-blush, black spots, small size, sweet, rich and dry.	Cider	
Harvey		England	1629	A green apple. Width 76–93 mm (3.0–3.7 in), height 68–81 mm (2.7–3.2 in). Stalk 12–18 mm (0.47–0.71 in). Flesh white-yellow, dry, sweet.	Cooking	PickE mid-September; use September–January
Hatsuaki		Japan	Introduced 1976	P Jonathan x Golden Delicious. Flesh juicy, sweet, good.	Eating	PickE mid-October. Use November–December.
Hauxapfel		Germany	1925	A German cider apple. Sugar-acid-ratio 9:1. Flesh; greenish-white, juicy, subacid.	Cider	PickG late October. Use November–March
Havelgold		Germany		P: Undine x Auralia. Flesh sharp and aromatic.	Cooking	Pick October; use December–February
Hawaii			1945 (introduced)	Noted for pineapple-like taste.	Eating	
Hawley		New York, US	<1855	Width 86 mm (3.4 in), height 72 mm (2.8 in). Stalk 17 mm (0.67 in). Flesh whitish, tender, juicy, subacid, very good. Tree vigorous, bears annually. Susceptible to scab.	Eating	Pick September; use September
Hawthornden(cs. Hawthorndenské)		Scotland	c. 1780	Width 73 mm (2.9 in), height 52 mm (2.0 in). Stalk 20–25 mm (0.79–0.98 in). Cells oblate or obovate, abaxile. Flesh white, crisp, tender, juicy. VitC 16.	Cooking	PickE mid-September. Use October–November
Hector Macdonald		Berkshire, England	Introduced 1906	Pale yellowish-green. Width 76 mm (3.0 in), height 64 mm (2.5 in). Flesh very crisp, juicy, acid. AM from RHS in 1904.	Cooking	PickE mid–late September. Use October–February
Helios		Müncheberg/Mark, Germany	Introduced 1969.	A yellow apple striped with red. P Oldenburg x unknown. Width 65 mm (2.6 in), height 60 mm (2.4 in), weight 115 g (4.1 oz). Stalk 20–30 mm (0.79–1.18 in). Flesh;aromatic, subacid.	Cooking, eating	PickG early August; use August
Hendrick Sweet see Sweet Winesap
Herefordshire Beefing		Herefordshire, England	<1800	A yellow apple with red flush. Width 76 mm (3.0 in), height 63 mm (2.5 in). Stalk short. Cells obovate, axile, closed. Flesh greenish white, subacid.		PickE early October; use November–January
Herefordshire Pearmain (a.k.a. Royal Pearmain, Old Pearmain)		Possibly England	<1800	Width 75 mm (3.0 in), height 61 mm (2.4 in). Stalk 11 mm (0.43 in). Cells roundish obovate, axile, closed. Flesh vinous, crisp, juicy spicy, aromatic, subacid, very good.	Eating, cooking	Use December–February
Herefordshire Russet		Kent, England	2002	Cox's Orange Pippin x Idared. Rich, aromatic flavour. Crops well.	Eating	Pick early October; stores until January
Herma		Germany		Width 84 mm (3.3 in), height 71 mm (2.8 in), weight 250 g (8.8 oz). Stalk 20–25 mm (0.79–0.98 in).	Cooking, eating	PickE late October. PickG mid–late October; use December–March
Herrings Pippin (a.k.a. Herring's Seedling)		Lincolnshire, England	1908, introduced 1917	Large round conical, rather ribbed, greenish yellow with red flush and stripes. Flesh pale yellow with spicy aromatic flavour. Width 83 mm (3.3 in), height 68–76 mm (2.7–3.0 in). Stalk 5–10 mm (0.20–0.39 in). P Cox Orange x Cellini. AM from RHS in 1920.	Eating, cooking	PickE early September; use September–November
Herrnhut (a.k.a. Schöner von Herrnhut)		Saxonia, Germany	1880	A greenish yellow apple with red flush. Width 64 mm (2.5 in), height 58 mm (2.3 in), weight 95 g (3.4 oz). Stalk 15–25 mm (0.59–0.98 in). Flesh; soft, juicy, subacid. Density 0.65	Cooking, eating	PickE mid-September. PickG mid-September; use October–December
Herzogin Olga		Germany	<1860	Width 72–80 mm (2.8–3.1 in), height 61–65 mm (2.4–2.6 in). Stalk 27 mm (1.1 in).	Cooking, eating	Pick late August; use September
Heta		Finland	Introduced 1996	A red apple roundish to conical. P Lobo x Huvitus.	Eating	Pick late September
Heusgen's Golden Reinette (a.k.a. Peter Heusgen's Gold-Reinette)		Germany	1877	A yellow apple with red flush. Width 70 mm (2.8 in), height 60 mm (2.4 in). Stalk medium. Flesh yellow, crisp, subacid.	Eating, cooking	PickE early October; use December–March
Heyer 12		Saskatchewan, Canada	Introduced c. 1940	A greenish yellow apple. Very cold-tolerant. Flesh juicy, acid.	Eating	Use mid-August–October
Hibernal		Russia	<1870	Fruit large, oblate-conic, yellow with red flush. Tree vigorous. Flesh yellow, firm, coarse, juicy, subacid, fair to good. TRI		PickE early September. Use September–January
Hiester (a.k.a. Heaster, Heister)		Pennsylvania, US	<1875	Flesh white, crisp, juicy, subacid, good. Tree vigorous, productive.	Eating	Use November–March
Higby Sweet (a.k.a. Lady Blush)		US	<1875	Width 74 mm (2.9 in), height 62 mm (2.4 in). Stalk 18 mm (0.71 in). Flesh white, tender, juicy, sweet, very good to best. Tree early and good bearer.	Eating	Use November–January
High Canons		England	Introduced 1887	Yellow with red flush. Width 76 mm (3.0 in), height 64 mm (2.5 in). FCC from RHS in 1884. Flesh extremely crisp, acid, cooking well.	Cooking	Use until April
Hightop Sweet		Plymouth, Massachusetts, US	>1640	Frog green-yellow skin with an occasional pink blush. Ribbed. May have some tiny white spots on the skin.	Eating, cooking	
High View Pippin		Weybridge, Surrey, England	1911	Small to medium-sized apple. Award of Merit from RHS in 1928.	Eating	PickE mid-October. Use November–March
Hildesheimer Goldrenette		Lower Saxony, Germany	<1889	A green apple with red flush. Width 74 mm (2.9 in), height 66 mm (2.6 in). Stalk 14 mm (0.55 in). Flesh whitish-yellow, juicy, subacid. Quality is good for eating.	Eating, drying	Pick October; use December–March
Himmelstalund		Sweden	<1870	Width 75 mm (3.0 in), height 58 mm (2.3 in). Flesh juicy, aromatic.	Eating	Use October–November
Histon Favourite (a.k.a. Chiver's Seedling)		Cambridgeshire, England	<1883	Width 77 mm (3.0 in), height 68 mm (2.7 in). Stalk variable. Flesh soft, juicy, sweet.	Eating, cooking	PickE late September; use October–December
Hoadley		US	<1894	W 91, H 65. Stalk 22 mm. Flesh white, crisp, tender, juicy, subacid, good.	Cooking	Use September- November
Hoary Morning		Possibly Somerset, England	<1819	Yellow with red stripes. Cells obovate, axile. Flesh, white, dry.	Cider, cooking, eating	PickE mid-September; use October–December
Hog Island Sweet		New York, US	<1857	Flesh yellow, juicy, crisp, tender, aromatic, very sweet, good to very good. Stalk short.	Eating	Use September–October
Holiday		Ohio, US	Introduced 1964	P Macoun x Jonathan. Flesh; crisp, juicy, sweet, vinous.	Eating, cooking, baking	Pick October 10 (in Ohio). PickE mid-October. Use November–December.
Holland Pippin (a.k.a. Summer Pippin, Pie Apple)		Ontario, Canada or US	<1820	Width 77 mm (3.0 in), height 58 mm (2.3 in). Stalk 17 mm (0.67 in). Seeds sometimes imperfect. Flavor not agreeable for eating. Flesh white, crisp, tender, very juicy, subacid, good to very good. One of the very best kitchen apples.	Cooking, pie	PickE mid-October. Use October–November
Holland Winter				A green apple. Width 85 mm (3.3 in), height 69 mm (2.7 in). Stalk 12 mm (0.47 in). Tree vigorous. Flesh white, firm, crisp, juicy, subacid, good.	Eating	Use December–May
Holstein (a.k.a. Holsteiner Cox)		Germany	1918, introduced 1950	An apple with a Cox-like flavour. Width 67–73 mm (2.6–2.9 in), height 67 mm (2.6 in). Stalk 9–15 mm (0.35–0.59 in). Flesh crisp, juicy, subacid.	Eating	PickE late September. PickG mid–late October: Pickg September 23–October 7. Use November–January
Honeycrisp		Minnesota, US	1960, introduced 1991	Has excellent eating and keeping qualities. Width 83 mm, height 73 mm. Yellow with 47% red overcolor. Very crisp white flesh is slightly tart with a strong honey-like sweetness. Quality varies from apple to apple. Developed by the University of Minnesota and best suited to cool climates. P Haralson x Keepsake.	Eating	Pick45 September 9. Pick55 August 25.
Honeygold		Minnesota, US	Cross made 1935, selected 1947, introduced 1969	P Golden Delicious x Haralson. Flesh crisp, yellow, juicy. Quality excellent. Sweet tasting fruit. Tree has very showy, light pink blossoms in spring. Ripens October 1 in Minnesota.	Eating	Pick45 September 25. Pick55 September 10. PickE late October. Use November–December.
Hook		US	<1880	A yellow apple. Width 91 mm (3.6 in), height 83 mm (3.3 in). Stalk 16 mm (0.63 in). Flesh white, tender, juicy, mild subacid, aromatic, very good.	Eating	Use October–November
Hoover (a.k.a. Wattaugah)		South Carolina, US	<1850	Width 79 mm (3.1 in), height 63 mm (2.5 in). Stalk 29 mm (1.1 in). Flesh yellowish, tender, juicy, subacid.	Eating	Use November–February
Horace		Ontario, Canada	Selected 1912	P Langford Beauty x unknown. A medium size highly colored, striped apple. Most nearly resembles Fameuse.		Use September–November
Hormead Pearmain		Hertfordshire, England	<1826	Medium conical, greenish yellow with light brown flush. Flesh crisp, very juicy and pleasant. Width 73 mm (2.9 in), height 64 mm (2.5 in). Stalk short. Cells roundish, obovate, axile. AM from RHS in 1900.	Cooking	PickE early October. Use December–May
Horneburger Pfannkuchenapfel		Germany		Flesh; white, juicy, subacid.	Cooking, Eating, Juice.	PickG early - mid October. Pickg September 10–30. Use January - March.
Horse (a.k.a. Haas, Yellow Hoss)		North Carolina, US	<1850	Width 81–83 mm (3.2–3.3 in), height 71–72 mm (2.8–2.8 in). Stalk 21–22 mm (0.83–0.87 in). Flesh yellow, tender, pleasant, subacid.	Cooking, drying	Use 31 July–1 August
Houblon		Berkshire England	<1901	P Peasgood Nonsuch x Cox Orange. Width 71 mm (2.8 in), height 60 mm (2.4 in). Stalk long. Raised by Charles Ross. Award of Merit from RHS in 1901.	Eating	PickE late September; use October–January
Hounslow Wonder		England	<1910	Orange-yellow with scarlet flush and stripes. Stalk short. AM from RHS in 1910.	Eating	PickE mid-September. Use September–October
Howgate Wonder agm		Isle of Wight, England	1960	Makes a lot of juice. Width 86 mm (3.4 in), height 72 mm (2.8 in). Flesh creamy-white, firm. P Annie Elizabeth x Peasgood Nonsuch.	Cooking	PickE early October; use October to March
Hubbard's Pearmain		Norfolk, England	<1800	One of the richest flavoured dessert apples. Width 62 mm (2.4 in), height 57 mm (2.2 in). Cells obovate, axile.	Eating	PickE early to mid-October. Use November–April
Hubbardston Nonsuch (a.k.a. John May, Hubbardston, Old Town Pippin, fr. Non-pareille de Hubbardston)		Massachusetts, US	<1860	Width 78–86 mm (3.1–3.4 in), height 70–77 mm (2.8–3.0 in). Stalk 17–28 mm (0.67–1.10 in). Flesh yellow juicy.	Eating	PickE mid-October. Use October–January
Humboldt		California, US	Introduced 1944	P Transcedent x unknown.		
Hunt's Duke of Gloucester		Gloucestershire, England	c. 1820	A desert apple of first rate quality	Eating	PickE mid-September. Use December–February
Hunt's Early		England	c. 1800	Yellow with brown-red flush. Width 64 mm (2.5 in), height 46 mm (1.8 in). P Margaret x Reinette de Hollande. Flesh soft, pale yellow, good.	Eating	Pick mid-August. Use August.

=== I ===
Common name	Image	Origin	First developed	Comment	Use	Pick/Use period
Idagold		Idaho, US	Introduced 1944	P Esopus Spitzenburg x Wagener.	Eating	PickE mid-October. Use January–March.
Idajon		Idaho, US	Selected 1936, Introduced 1949	P Wagener x Jonathan. Ripens 10 days before Jonathan. Cold storage3-4 °C 120 days.	Eating	PickE late October. Use December–January.
Idared agm		Moscow, Idaho, US	Selected 1935, introduced 1942	A medium-sized deep red apple. Crisp white flesh is tart and juicy, and can be somewhat bland if eaten out of hand, however, Idared is an exceptional cooking apple. Flesh keeps is shape, and the flavour becomes much stronger with cooking. An excellent keeping apple, Idared remains hardy and durable in proper storage for as long as 8 months. Idared is a cross between Jonathan and Wagener developed at the University of Idaho. Width 65–90 mm (2.6–3.5 in), height 50–75 mm (2.0–3.0 in), weight 150–180 g (5.3–6.3 oz). Stalk 18–30 mm (0.71–1.18 in). Prone to canker, scab, very prone to mildew. Cold storage 2-3 °C 180 days. Density 0.79	Cooking, eating	Pick45 October 4. Pick55 September 20. PickE mid-October. PickG late October. Pickg October 1–25. Use December–April
Imperatriz		Brazil	Introduced 1997	P Gala x Mollie's Delicious. Flesh sweet, subacid.	Eating	
Improved Blaxtayman 201.		Washington, US	Introduced 1944	Mutation of Stayman Winesap		
Indo		Japan	<1930	Flesh greenis-yellow, sweet, very firm.	Eating	PickE mid to late October. Use January - March.
Ingol		Germany	1954	A red apple. Weight 184 g (6.5 oz). P Ingrid Marie x Golden Delicious. Cold storage 1 °C 120 days.	Eating	PickG late September–early October. PickE early October. Pickg September 23–October 7. Use October–January
Ingrid Marie		Flemløse, Denmark	1910, introduced 1936.	A medium size (90–180 g (3.2–6.3 oz)) red apple. Width 75 mm (3.0 in), height 55 mm (2.2 in). Stalk 12–25 mm (0.47–0.98 in). P Cox Orange x Cox Pomona. Flesh: juicy, subacid. The most popular eating apple in Sweden. Cold storage 4 °C 100 days. Density 0.80	Eating	PickE late September.Pickg September 15–30. Use November–February
Irish Peach		Kilkenny, Ireland	19th century	Excellent for baking. Early harvest. Width 61–65 mm (2.4–2.6 in), height 48–55 mm (1.9–2.2 in). Stalk 15 mm (0.59 in).Cells obovate, axile, open. More difficult to find within land of origin due to primary use for export to UK. Hardy, tastes very good straight off tree.	Cooking, eating	PickE mid–late August; use August–September

=== J ===
Common name	Image	Origin	First developed	Comment	Use	Pick/Use period
Jacobs Sweet		Massachusetts, US	c. 1860	A round yellow apple. Flesh yellow, firm, tender, crisp, juicy, aromatic, very sweet, good.	Eating	Use October–April
Jakob Fischer		Germany	1903	A yellow apple with red flush. Flesh; juicy, subacid.	Eating	PickG September; use September–October
Jakob Lebel (cs. Lebelovo, fr. Jacques Lebel)		Amiens, France	1825, introduced 1849.	A very large apple. Width 82–94 mm (3.2–3.7 in), height 63–73 mm (2.5–2.9 in). Weight 185 g (6.5 oz). Stalk 10–25 mm (0.39–0.98 in). Flesh; soft, juicy, subacid to acid. Cold storage 2 °C 150 days. VitC 8. Density 0.81 TRI	Cooking, juice	PickG mid-September; use October–December.
Jamba		Germany	1954. Introduced 1969.	Flesh; aromatic, juicy, subacid. Cold storage 4 °C 60 days.	Eating	PickE early September. PickG mid-August–early September. Pickg August 23–September 7. Use August–October.
James Grieve agm		Edinburgh, Scotland	1893	Good taste, but poor keeper (bruises easily). Width 70–80 mm (2.8–3.1 in), height 60–65 mm (2.4–2.6 in). Weight 140 g (4.9 oz). Stalk 15–33 mm (0.59–1.30 in). AM from RHS in 1897. FCC from RHS in 1906. Prone to scab, canker, resistant to mildew. Flesh; soft, juicy, aromatic, subacid to sweet. Cold storage 4 °C 60 days. VitC 7. Density 0.76	Cooking, eating	PickE early September. Pickg August 25–September 7. Use September–October
Jaspi		Finland	Introduced 1980	A red apple. P Lobo x Huvitus. Flesh sweet, subacid, aromatic, good.	Eating	Pick September; use September–October
Jaune		Montfort, Sarthe, France	<1860	A yellow apple. Width 78 mm (3.1 in), height 60–70 mm (2.4–2.8 in). Stalk 5–10 mm (0.20–0.39 in).		Use January–May
Jazz (Scifresh)		New Zealand	Cross made 1985, introduced 2007	Bright red round apple with subtle yellow under-striping. Tart to sweet, dense and very crunchy with effervescent texture. From sweet Royal Gala × firm, tart Braeburn. Widely sold commercially in the UK.	Eating	Pick 1 week before Braeburn
Jefferies		Pennsylvania, US	<1849	Width 73 mm (2.9 in), height 53–57 mm (2.1–2.2 in). Stalk 16 mm (0.63 in). Flesh yellowish-white, juicy, crisp, tender, subacid, aromatic, very good. DBH 116.	Eating	Pick50 September 1. PickE mid-September. Use September–December.
Jerseymac		New Jersey, US	Cross made 1956, selected 1961, introduced 1971.	A green apple flushed with red (50–75%). Width 70–73 mm (2.8–2.9 in). Flesh; juicy, aromatic, subacid. Cold storage 3-4 °C 90 days.	Eating	PickG mid-August. Use August.
Jersey Sweet		US	<1820	Width 72–90 mm (2.8–3.5 in), height 67 mm (2.6 in). Stalk 13–17 mm (0.51–0.67 in). Flesh yellow, tender, juicy, aromatic, very sweet, good to very good.	Baking	Use August–October
Jewett Red		New Hampshire, US	<1850	Yellow with red flush. Width 65 mm (2.6 in), height 57 mm (2.2 in). Stalk 10 mm (0.39 in). Flesh yellow, tender, juicy, aromatic, mild subacid, good to very good.	Eating	Use October–February
John Standish		Berkshire, England	Raised 1873, introduced 1921	Yellow-white flat-round apple, 50–75% flushed. Width 63 mm (2.5 in), height 54–57 mm (2.1–2.2 in). Stalk 15–23 mm (0.59–0.91 in). AM from RHS in 1922.	Eating	Pick mid-October; use December–February
Jonadel		Iowa, US	Raised 1923, introduced 1958	Parentage Jonathan x Red Delicious. Cold storage 2 °C 150 days.	Eating	
Jonafree (a.k.a. Co-op 22)		Urbana, Illinois, US	Selected 1972, introduced 1979	Flesh yellow, fine grained, crisp, juicy. Tree is vigorous. Width 63–76 mm (2.5–3.0 in), height 55–70 mm (2.2–2.8 in). Stalk 15 mm (0.59 in). P: (14-644 x Jonathan) x (Gallia Beauty x Red Spy).	Eating	Pick45 September 10. Pick55 September 1. Use September–October.
Jonagold agm		Geneva, New York, US	cross made 1953, first fruited 1953, introduced 1968	P Golden Delicious x Jonathan. Popular in Europe and land of origin. Width 60–90 mm (2.4–3.5 in), height 60–85 mm (2.4–3.3 in). Weight 150–200 g (5.3–7.1 oz). Stalk 15–35 mm (0.59–1.38 in). Several highly coloured strains are available. Widely sold commercially in the United Kingdom. Cold storage 0-1 °C 90 days. Density 0.82 TRI	Eating, cooking	Pick45 October 4. Pick55 September 15. Pickg September 23 –October 15. Use October–March.
Jonagrimes		Indiana, US	Introduced 1920s.	P unknown. A yellow apple streaked with red.	Eating, cooking	Ripens two weeks ahead of Jonathan.
Jonamac		Geneva, New York, US	1972	P McIntosh x Jonathan.	Eating	Pick45 September 15. Pick55 August 26.
Jonared		Washington, US	Discovered 1930. Introduced 1934	Mutation of Jonathan.		
Jonathan (cs. Jonatan, ru. Djonathan)		Kingston, New York, US	1820s	Tart taste. Mostly red apple with patches of lime green. Width 67 mm (2.6 in), height 58–61 mm (2.3–2.4 in). Weight 95–110 g (3.4–3.9 oz). Stalk 8–18 mm (0.31–0.71 in). Cells obovate, axile, slit. VitC 9-25. Density 0.77 Does well in cooler areas; some frost resistance. DBH 139–145.	Cooking (pie), eating	Pick45 September 15. Pick55 September 5. PickE early October. Pickg September 23–October 15. Use November–April.
Jonwin		California, US	Introduced 1944	P Jonathan x Baldwin.		Pick early October; use November–April
Joybells		Surrey, England	1914	Pale yellow, 25–75% flushed red. Flesh crisp, juicy and sweet, with pleasant flavour. AGM from RHS in 1922. Width 77 mm (3.0 in), height 63 mm (2.5 in). Stalk variable.	Eating	Pick late September; use October–March
Joyce		Ottawa, Canada	Raised 1898, selected 1912, introduced 1924.	A green apple with red overcolor. Width 64–81 mm (2.5–3.2 in), height 56–69 mm (2.2–2.7 in). Stalk 15 mm (0.59 in). Flesh: white, soft, sweet. DBH 107	Eating	Pick50 August 21.
Jubilee		B.C. Canada	Introduced 1939	P McIntosh x Grimes Golden. Flesh cream-colored, firm, crisp, juicy.		Pick 3 weeks later than McIntosh. Use until February.
Judson		Iowa, US	<1899	Greenish yellow with red flush. Width 99 mm (3.9 in), height 85 mm (3.3 in). Stalk 16 mm (0.63 in). Flesh white, firm, crisp, juicy, fair to good.	Eating	Use October–December
Juliet		Illinois, US	Cross made 1970, selected 1977	A green apple with red overcolor (60–90%). Width 64–76 mm (2.5–3.0 in), height 56–67 mm (2.2–2.6 in). Stalk 20–23 mm (0.79–0.91 in). Flesh yellow, firm, crisp, fruity, subacid. SS 14.7	Eating, cooking	Pick: 2–3 weeks after Delicious.
Julita Gylling		Sweden		Yellow with red flush. Width 69 mm (2.7 in), height 61 mm (2.4 in). Stalk 10–30 mm (0.39–1.18 in).	Cooking, eating	Pick September; use October–December
Julyred		New Jersey, US	Introduced 1962	Width 62–70 mm, height 53–61 mm. Stalk 24 mm. Flesh white, soft, juicy, subacid.	Eating	PickG late July - early August.
Junaluska		North Carolina, US	c. 1815	Once thought to be extinct but rediscovered in 2001 in rural North Carolina. Native American origin. Named for Cherokee chief Junaluska, leader in Battle of Horseshoe Bend, believed to have planted original tree. Extremely russeted and ugly apple but very hardy tree with superior taste to commercial varieties.	Cooking, cider, eating	
Junami (a.k.a. Diwa, Milwa)		Switzerland	c. 2010	A cross between Idared and Maigold with Elstar. Beautifully round, fresh and fruity taste with a crunchy bite.	Cooking, eating	
June Wealthy		Ohio, US	Introduced 1947	P Wealthy x unknown. A dark red apple. Ripens with Yellow Transparent.		
Juno		Müncheberg/Mark, Germany	Introduced 1971	A yellow to green apple with red overcolor. Width 79 mm (3.1 in), height 62 mm (2.4 in), weight 190 g (6.7 oz). Stalk 15–22 mm (0.59–0.87 in). Flesh, juicy, aromatic, subacid. Density 0.83	Eating, cooking, juice	Pick October; use January–May
Junost		Russia	1938	A yellow apple. P Gulkanel x Transparante Blanche. Flesh juicy, sweet, good.	Eating, cooking	Pick September
Jupiter agm		England	raised 1966, introduced 1981	A large, round, slightly conic apple. Width 64 mm (2.5 in), height 58 mm (2.3 in). Light yellow-green skin with a red-orange blush and stripes. Strong apple flavour is well-balanced between sweet and sharp. Cross of Cox's Orange Pippin and Starking Delicious (a red sport of Delicious), apple retains Cox's flavour, but tree is easier to grow. TRI.	Eating	PickE early October. Use October–January.

=== K ===
Common name	Image	Origin	First developed	Comment	Use	Pick/Use period
Kaighn (a.k.a. Kaighn Spitzenburg)		Gloucester County, New Jersey, US	<1830	Flesh yellow, juicy, tender. Tree vigorous.	Cooking, Drying	Use November- January
Kaiser Wilhelm		Germany	1864	A large apple width 94 mm, height 80 mm,(170 g (6.0 oz)). Stalk 18 mm. Golden Reinette x unknown. Flesh; dry subacid. Cold storage 2 °C 180 days. VitC 15. Density 0.77	Eating, cooking	PickE early October. PickG mid October. Use November–March
Kalemčica		Montenegro		A green apple. Russet in stalk cavity. Width 70 mm (2.8 in), height 48 mm (1.9 in), weight 76 g (2.7 oz). Stalk short to medium. Flesh cream colored, juicy, sweet. Disease resistant.	Eating, cooking, cider	Pick September; use September–March
Kalmar Glasäpple		Sweden	18th century	The body is light yellow, and the taste is a mix of acidity and sweetness. Width 78 mm (3.1 in), height 65 mm (2.6 in). Stalk 8–15 mm (0.31–0.59 in). Harvesting may begin in early October and it is typically fully ripe in early December.	Cooking, eating	
Kalterer Böhmer (ru. Kalteter Böhmer, Mantuanskoe, Nariadnoe, Zimnee raspisnoe)		South Tyrolean, Austria	<1900	A yellow apple with red flush (75%). Width 70 mm (2.8 in), height 55 mm (2.2 in). Flesh, white, subacid, aromatic, good. Cold storage 2 °C 180 days.	Eating, cooking	Pick October; use November–February
Kanzi (a.k.a. Nicoter)		Belgium	1991	Gala × Braeburn. Crunchy, juicy, sweet, slightly tangier than Gala.	Eating	
Karapash		Albania		Yellow to green with red stripes. Width 60–70 mm (2.4–2.8 in), height 60–70 mm (2.4–2.8 in), weight 110–150 g (3.9–5.3 oz). Stalk short to medium. Flesh white, juicy, sweet, subacid, aromatic. Sensitive to apple scab.	Eating	Pick late October
Kardinal Bea		Germany	1930	A German cider apple. Sugar-acid-ratio 15:1. Flesh; greenish-white, juicy, subacid.	Cider, juice	PickG early October; use October–February
Karmeliter Renette (see Reinette de Carmes)
Karmijn de Sonnaville (a.k.a. Karminj)		Wageningen, Netherlands	Cross made 1949, introduced 1971	Yellow ground colour when ripe, with red flush, and russet depending on the season. Large apple, though shape can be irregular. Cold storage 4 °C 90 days. TRI	Cooking, juice, eating	PickE early October. PickG early–mid-October. Pickg September 23–October 7. Use October–December.
Kasseler Renette (see Dutch Mignonne)						
Katy (apple) (a.k.a. Katja)		Balsgård, Fjälkestad, Sweden	Cross made 1947, selected 1955, introduced 1966.	Early eating apple with red skin and pale cream flesh. Width 66 mm (2.6 in), height 60 mm (2.4 in). Stalk 21 mm (0.83 in). Well suited to Northern European climate.	Eating	PickE early September; use September–early October
Kavlås		Sweden	<1820	Width 80–87 mm (3.1–3.4 in), height 70–79 mm (2.8–3.1 in). Stalk 20–30 mm (0.79–1.18 in). Flesh juicy, sweet, subacid, good.	Eating	Pick early October; use October–December
Kendall		Geneva, New York	Introduced 1932	Large, dark red. P McIntosh x Zusoff	Eating	PickE early October.
Keepsake		Minnesota, US	Cross made 1936, selected 1947, introduced 1978	A green apple with red overcolor. Width 72 mm (2.8 in), height 66 mm (2.6 in). Stalk 12 mm (0.47 in). Flesh: light yellow, hard crisp, juicy, sweet, aromatic, good. DBH 155–170.	Eating, pie	
Kent (see Malling Kent)
Kentucky Long Stem		Kentucky, US	<1850	Flesh greenish white, sweet, subacid.	Eating	Use December–March
Kerry Pippin		County Antrim, Ireland	c. 1805	Pale to golden yellow flesh. Delightful spicy taste. Well suited to Ireland's moist, cool climate. Width 54–60 mm (2.1–2.4 in), height 44–56 mm (1.7–2.2 in). Stalk 15–26 mm (0.59–1.02 in). Cells round to obovate, axile.	Eating	PickE late August; use August–September. Denmark pick mid-September, use October–November.
Keswick Codlin (a.k.a. Keswick)		England	Introduced 1790	A yellow apple. Width 74 mm (2.9 in), height 67 mm (2.6 in). Stalk 9 mm (0.35 in). Cells ovate, abaxile. Flesh yellowish white, soft, acid.	Cooking	PickE mid–late August; use August–October
Kidd's Orange Red agm		New Zealand	1924	Cox's Orange Pippin × Delicious. Yellow skin with orange red flush. Width 67 mm (2.6 in), height 64 mm (2.5 in). Chewy rather than crunchy. Flesh; crisp, juicy, aromatic. Cold storage 4 °C 90 days.	Eating	PickE mid-October. PickG late September–early October. Use November–January.
Kim		Sweden	1955	Yellow apple with red overcolour. Width 71 mm (2.8 in), height 66 mm (2.6 in). P Cortland x Ingrid Marie.	Eating, cooking	PickE late September; use October–March
King Albert		England	<1936	Large yellow striped with scarlet. Stalk short.	Cooking	
King David		Arkansas, US	1893. Introduced 1902	Yellow with red stripes. P Jonathan x Winesap.	Cooking, eating	PickE mid-October. Use October–November
King Georg V		Isle of Wight, England	1898	P Cox Orange x unknown. Width 69 mm (2.7 in), height 60 mm (2.4 in). Stalk variable. AM from RHS in 1927. Flesh white, crisp, juicy, subacid with pineapple flavour.	Eating	PickE mid-October; use November–March
King Harry		England	<1892	Pale yellow with russet. Oval-conical. Width 64 mm (2.5 in), height 70 mm (2.8 in). Flesh firm, yellow, good. AM from RHS in 1892.	Cooking	Use October–November
King of the Pippins (cs. Parména zlatá, de. Winter Goldparmäne, fr. Reine des Reinettes, pl. Królowa renet, ru. Zolotoi parmen, Zimnii zoltoi parmen) agm		France	<1800	Suitable for more northerly (southerly in the Southern Hemisphere) areas with higher rainfall. Width 67–70 mm (2.6–2.8 in), height 57–66 mm (2.2–2.6 in), weight 110 g (3.9 oz). Stalk 10–20 mm (0.39–0.79 in). VitC 18–20. Density 0.84	Eating, cooking, cider	PickG mid-September–early October. PickE early October. Pickg September 15–30. Use October–February
King of Tompkins County (a.k.a. King Apple, Toms Red, Tommy Red)		New Jersey, US	<1804	Width 74–87 mm (2.9–3.4 in), height 60–70 mm (2.4–2.8 in). Stalk 19–22 mm (0.75–0.87 in). Cells obovate abaxile. Flesh juicy, tender, vinous, aromatic. AM from RHS in 1900. Triploid.	Eating	PickE mid-October. Use December–March
King Russet agm		United Kingdom		Russetted form of King of the Pippins	Eating	
King's Acre Bountiful		Herefordshire, England	<1904	Creamy white. Width 70 mm (2.8 in), height 57 mm (2.2 in). Stalk short. AM from RHS in 1904. Tree very fertile.	Cooking	PickE early September. Use October–November
King's Acre Pippin		England	1897	P Sturmer Pippin x Ribston. Width 73–82 mm (2.9–3.2 in), height 67–72 mm (2.6–2.8 in). AM from RHS in 1897. Stalk 17 mm (0.67 in). Flesh white, juicy, aromatic.	Eating	PickE mid-October; use December–March
Kingston Black agm				Small yellow fruits, heavily flushed with deep red. Does not bear or store well. Fruits November	Cider	
Kissabel Rouge		Seiches sur le Loir, France	cross made 2006	Width 78 mm. Resistant to scab.	Eating	ripens with Braeburn
Kleiner Fleiner		Württemberg, Germany	<1794	A yellow conical apple with red overcolor. Width 56–67 mm., height 53–68 mm. Stalk 10 mm. Flesh, juicy, subacid.	Eating, Cooking	Pick October. Use November - March.
Klockhammarsäpple		Sweden	<1860	A small yellow apple with red stripes. Width 62 mm (2.4 in), height 54 mm (2.1 in).	Eating, cooking	
Knobby Russet (a.k.a. Knobbed Russet; Old Maid's Winter Apple)		Sussex, England	1819	Green and yellow, with rough and black russet. Unusually irregular, warty and knobbly surface.	Cider, eating	PickE mid-October. Use December–March
Konfetnoje (a.k.a. Konfetnaja)		Russia		A yellow apple with some red stripes. P Papirova x Korobovka. Flesh has a pear-like aroma.	Eating	Pick mid–late August
Konsta		Finland	Introduced 1997	A red apple. P Lobo x Antonovka. Flesh white, subacid, aromatic.	Eating, cooking	Pick mid-October
Koritschnevoje		Russia	<1850	A yellow apple with red stripes.	Eating	Pick September; use September–October
Koritschnevoje Ananásnoje		Russia	<1840	Medium size round, green with yellow stripes.	Cooking, eating	Pick September, use September
Kosztela		Poland	16th century		Eating	
Krstovača		Montenegro		Yellowish green with red flush. Width 67 mm (2.6 in), height 68 mm (2.7 in), weight 180 g (6.3 oz). Stalk medium. Flesh, firm, sweet, juicy. Disease resistant.	Eating, cooking	Pick October; use October–April
Krupnaja		Montenegro		A greenish-yellow apple. Width 74 mm (2.9 in), height 61 mm (2.4 in), weight 180 g (6.3 oz). Stalk short to medium. Flesh creamy white, firm, juicy, tasty.	Eating, cooking	Pick early September; use September–October
Kugelapfel		Germany	<1800	A green apple with red overcolor (0-15%). Width 69–98 mm, height 58–75 mm. Stalk 21 mm. Flesh subacid.	Cooking	Pick October. Use December - May.
Kuqula (a.k.a. Mollekuqja)		Albania		A yellow apple with red covering (75%). Width 50–60 mm (2.0–2.4 in), height 60–65 mm (2.4–2.6 in), weight 80–100 g (2.8–3.5 oz). Flesh yellowish white, subacid, sweet, aromatic. Resistant to Venturia ineaqualis and Codling Moth. A good keeper.	Eating	Pick early October

== See also ==
- Cooking apple
- Lists of cultivars
- List of apple dishes
- List of Japanese apple cultivars
- Welsh apples
