= Cooking apple =

Apple that is used primarily for cooking

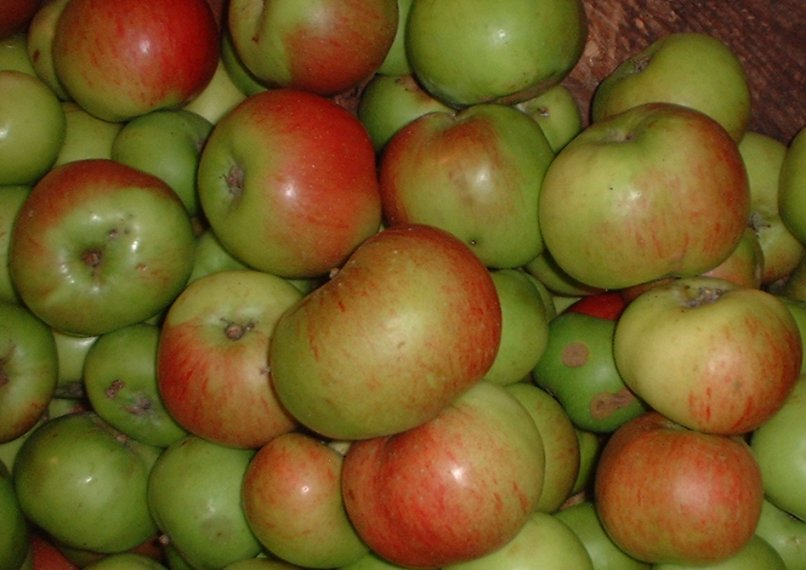
Bramley apples

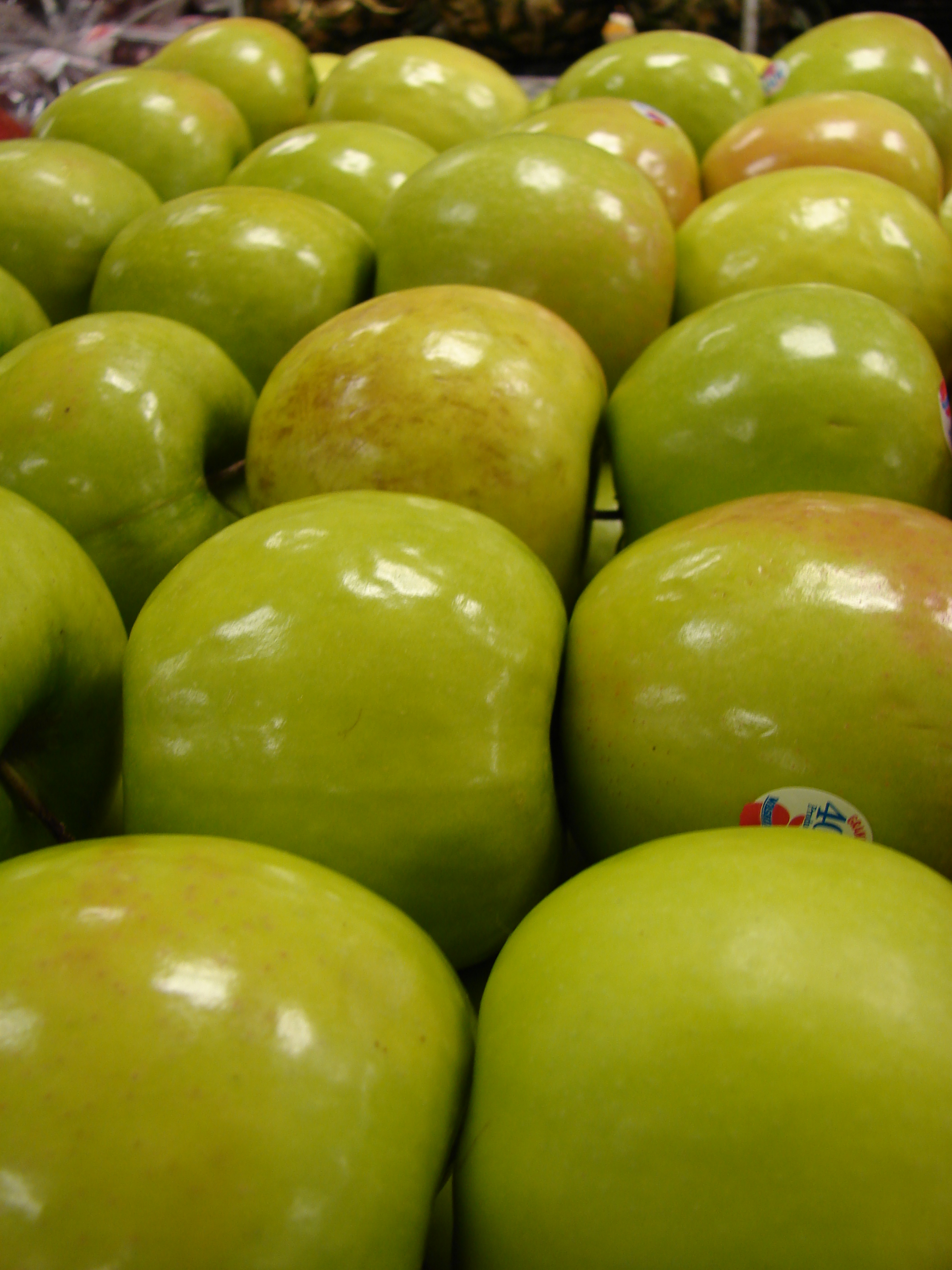
Granny Smith apples

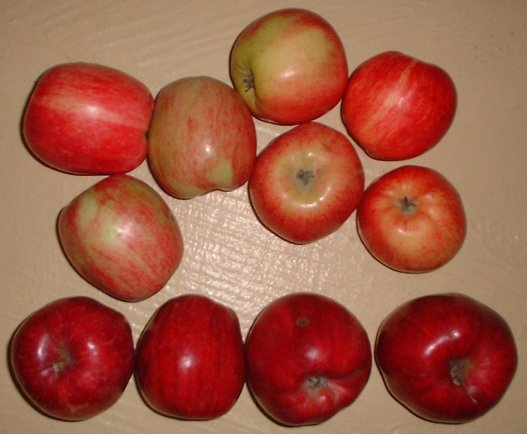
Red Gravenstein apples

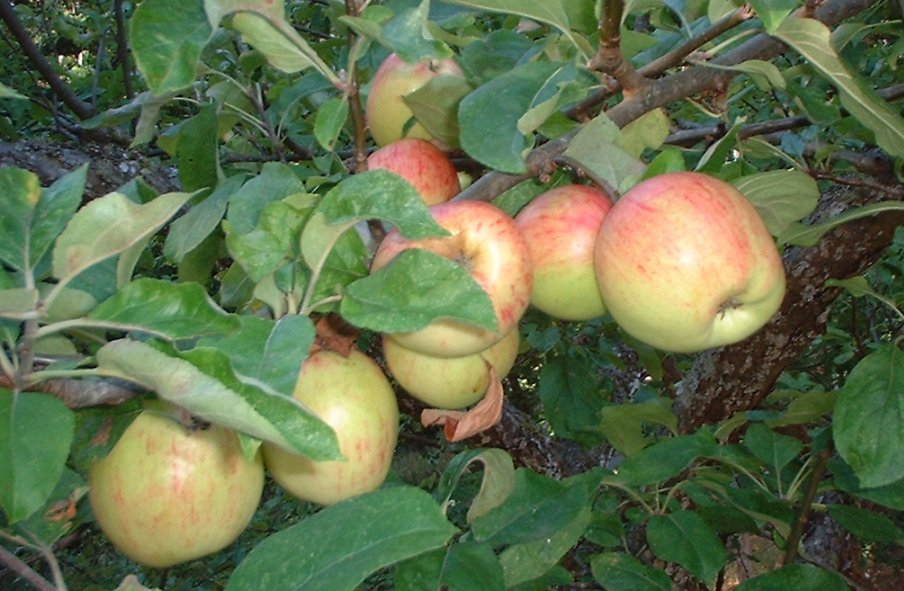
Yellow Gravenstein

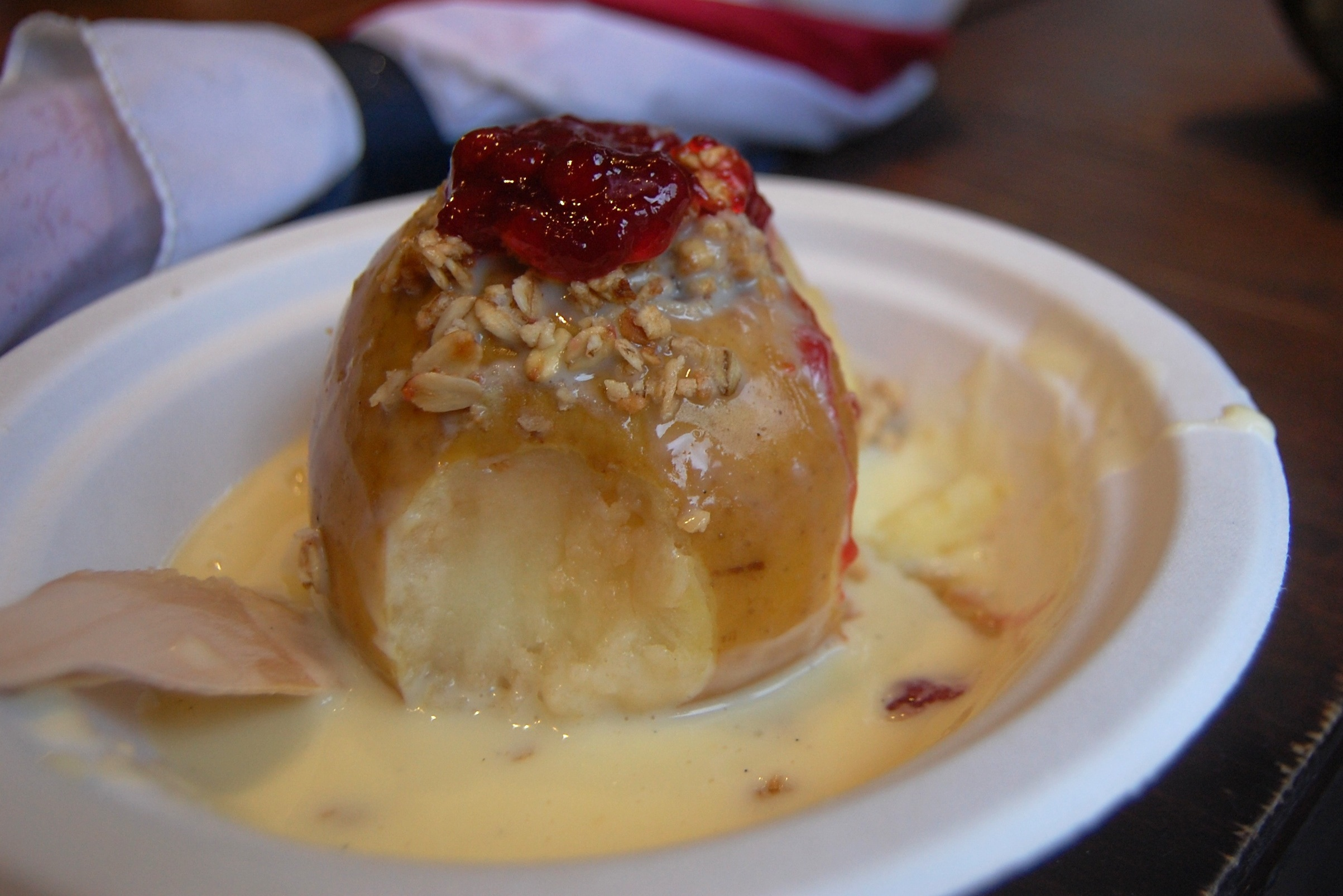
Baked apple with vanilla sauce

A cooking apple or culinary apple is an apple that is used primarily for cooking, as opposed to a dessert apple, which is eaten raw. Cooking apples are generally larger, and can be tarter than dessert varieties. Some varieties have a firm flesh that does not break down much when cooked. Culinary varieties with a high acid content produce froth when cooked, which is desirable for some recipes. Britain grows a large range of apples specifically for cooking. Worldwide, dual-purpose varieties (for both cooking and eating raw) are more widely grown.

There are many apples that have been cultivated to have the firmness and tartness desired for cooking. Yet each variety of apple has unique qualities, and categories such as "cooking" or "eating" are suggestive, rather than exact.

How an apple will perform once cooked is tested by simmering a half inch wedge in water until tender, then prodding to see if its shape is intact. The apple can then be tasted to see how its flavour has been maintained and if sugar should be added.

Apples can be cooked down into sauce, apple butter, or fruit preserves. They can be baked in an oven and served with custard, and made into pies or apple crumble. In the UK roast pork is commonly served with cold apple sauce made from boiled and mashed apples.

A baked apple is baked in an oven until it has become soft. The core is usually removed before baking and the resulting cavity stuffed with fruits, brown sugar, raisins, or cinnamon, and sometimes a liquor such as brandy. An apple dumpling adds a pastry crust.

John Claudius Loudon wrote in 1842:

Properties of a good apple — Apples for table are characterised by a firm pulp, elevated, poignant flavour, regular form, and beautiful colouring; those for kitchen use by the property of falling as it is technically termed, or forming in general a pulpy mass of equal consistency when baked or boiled, and by a large size. Some sorts of apples have the property of falling when green, as the Keswick, Carlisle, Hawthornden, and other codlins; and some only after being ripe, as the russet tribes. Those with this property when green are particularly valuable for affording sauces to geese early in the season, and for succeeding the gooseberry in tarts.

== History ==
Popular cooking apples in US, in the late 19th century:

Tart varieties:

- Duchess of Oldenburg
- Fallawater
- Gravenstein
- Horse
- Keswick Codlin
- Red Astrachan
- Rhode Island Greening
- Tetofsky

Sweet varieties:

- Golden Sweet
- Maverack Sweet
- Peach Pound Sweet
- Tolman Sweet
- Willis Sweet

Popular cooking apples in early 20th century England:

- Alfriston
- Beauty of Kent
- Bismark
- Bramley
- Cox Pomona
- Dumelow
- Ecklinville
- Emneth Early
- Golden Noble
- Grenadier
- Lord Grosvenor
- Lord Derby
- Newton Wonder
- Stirling Castle
- Warner's King

== Cooking apple cultivars ==
D = Dual purpose (table + cooking); Cooking result: P = puree, K = keeps shape

- Alfriston P
- Allington K
- Annie Elizabeth K
- Antonovka P
- Arthur Turner P
- Baldwin
- Ballyfatten
- Bancroft
- Baron Ward
- Beacon
- Beauty of Kent P
- Belle de Boskoop K
- Bismarck apple P
- Black Amish D
- Black Twig D
- Blenheim Orange P - K
- Bloody Ploughman
- Bountiful
- Braeburn K
- Bramley P
- Crab apple (primarily for jelly)
- Burr Knot P
- Byflett Seedling P
- Byford Wonder K
- Calville Blanc d'hiver K
- Calville Rouge d´automne K
- Calville Rouge d´hiver P
- Campanino
- Carlisle Codlin P
- Carolina Red June
- Carter's Blue
- Catshead P
- Cellini P
- Charles Ross K
- Chelmsford Wonder P
- Cockle Pippin P
- Colloggett Pippin P - K
- 'Cortland' D
- Coul Blush
- Cox Pomona P - K
- Custard
- Danziger Kantapfel K
- Doctor Harvey
- Duchess of Oldenburg
- Dudley Winter
- Dumelow's Seedling P
- Edward VII P
- Tom Brady
- Esopus Spitzenburg D
- Fallawater
- Flower of Kent
- Galloway K
- Gennet Moyle
- George Neal
- Glockenapfel
- Ginger Gold
- Golden Noble
- Golden Pippin
- Golden Reinette P - K
- Golden Sweet
- Gragg
- Gravenstein
- Granny Smith D
- Greenup´s Pippin P
- Grenadier
- Hambledon Deux Ans P - K
- Harrison Cider Apple
- Hawthornden P
- Howgate Wonder K
- Irish Peach
- Isaac Newton
- James Grieve D
- Jonathan D
- Jumbo
- Keswick Codlin P
- King of the Pippins K D
- Landsberger Reinette
- Lane's Prince Albert P
- Lodi
- Lord Derby P
- Lowell
- Maiden Blush
- Malinda
- McIntosh D
- My Jewel
- Newell-Kimzey (aka Airlie Red Flesh)
- Newton Wonder P
- Nickajack
- Norfolk Biffin K
- Northern greening
- Northern Spy
- Oldenburg
- Paulared D
- Peasgood's Nonsuch P - K
- Pink Lady D
- Pinova
- Porter's
- Pott's Seedling
- Pumpkin Sweet apple
- Queen P
- Red Astrachan
- Red Prince
- Reverend W. Wilks P
- Rhode Island Greening
- Rome Beauty
- Sandow
- Scotch Bridget
- Scotch Dumpling
- Schoolmaster P
- Stirling Castle P
- Smokehouse
- Snow apple (aka Fameuse)
- Spartan
- Stayman
- Stirling Castle P
- Surprise K
- Tetofsky
- Tickled Pink
- Tolman Sweet
- Tom Putt
- Topaz
- Transparante de Croncels K
- Twenty Ounce K
- Wagener
- Warner's King P
- Wealthy D
- White Melrose
- White Transparent
- Winesap K D
- Wolf River K
- York Imperial D

== See also ==
- Apple pie
- List of apple cultivars
- List of apple dishes
