= Bough =

Bough is a surname. It may refer to:

== People ==
- Frank Bough (1933–2020), British television presenter
- Sam Bough (1822–1878), Scottish landscape painter
- Søren Bough (1873–1939), Norwegian sport shooter and Olympics competitor
- Stephen R. Bough (born 1970), American judge

== Fictional characters ==
- Angus Bough, the fictional assistant to the titular secret agent in the British comedy film Johnny English

== Other ==
- Autumn Bough – Apple cultivar
- Bough pot – Ceramic pot used to display flowers and branches
- Bough, Townland in County Monaghan
- Sweet Bough – Apple cultivar

== See also ==
- Bough Beech, a hamlet in Kent, England
- Cedar Bough Place Historic District – Historic district in Indiana, United States
- Golden Bough – 1890 book by James Frazer
- When the Bough Breaks – The many cultural works of this name
