= Peasgood =

Peasgood is a surname. Notable people with the surname include:

- Alison Peasgood (born 1987), British paratriathlete
- George Peasgood (born 1995), British paratriathlete
- Emily Peasgood (born 1981), English composer and sound artist
- James T. Peasgood (1890–1957), American embezzler
- Julie Peasgood (born 1956), English actor, television presenter, author and voiceover artist
- Osborne Peasgood (1902–1962), English organist

== See also ==
- Peasgood's Nonsuch, an apple cultivar
