= Lodi (apple) =

Apple cultivar

'Lodi'
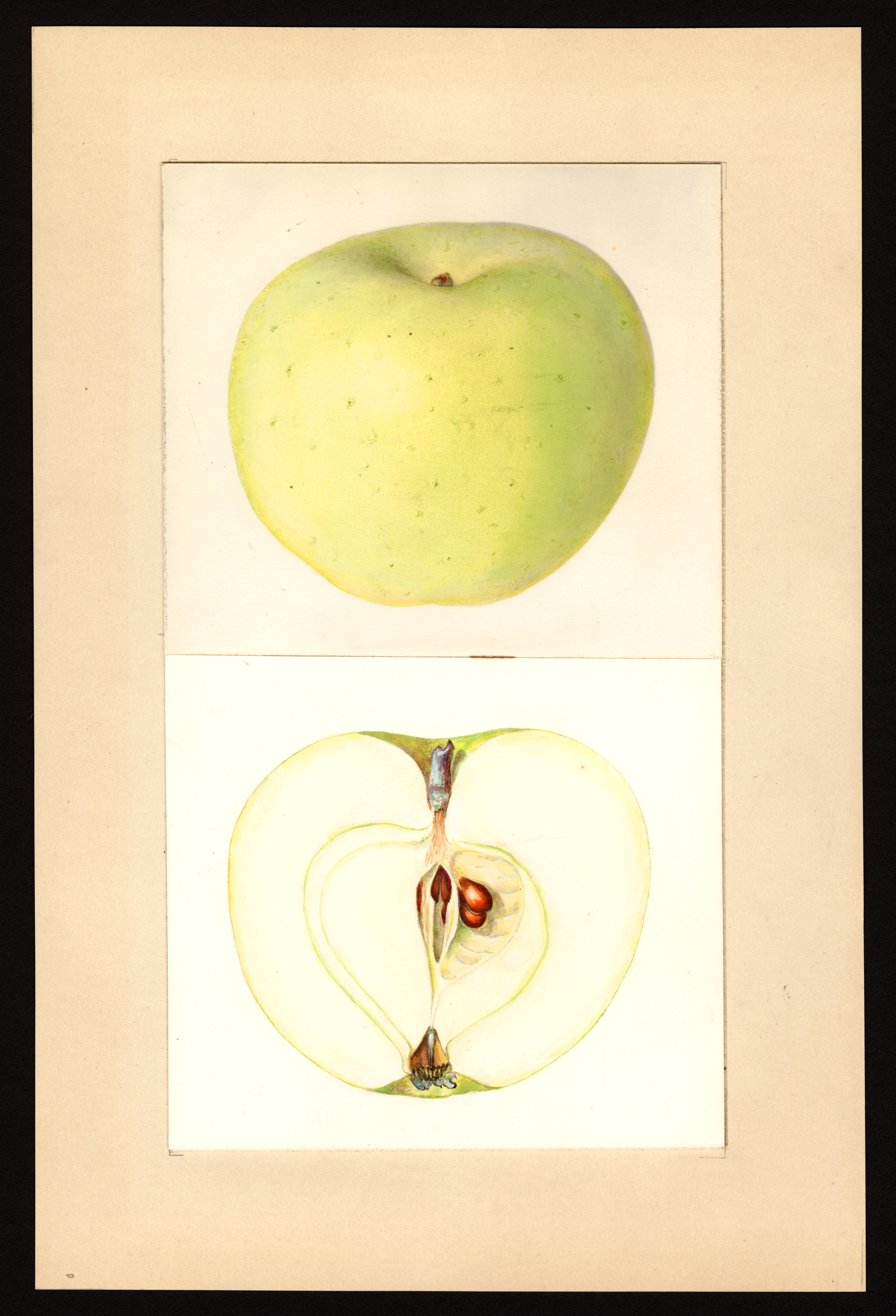
- Species: Malus domestica

The Lodi is an apple cultivar that is a hybrid of the 'Yellow Transparent' and 'Montgomery Sweet' ('Autumn Bough') cultivars, both of which were originally from the New York Agricultural Experiment Station. It was introduced in 1924 and is commonly grown in the Southern United States.

The Lodi apple is light green in color and has been described as an early season, summer apple, and also as a cooking apple The cultivar has also been described as suitable for saucing (making applesauce).

== See also ==
- List of apple cultivars
