= Maiden's Blush =

Maiden's Blush can refer to:

- Cyclophora punctaria, a moth species
- The Maiden Blush apple cultivar
- The Hawthornden apple cultivar (incorrectly)
- Euroschinus falcatus, a tree of eastern Australia
- Rosa 'Great Maiden's Blush', a rose
- Sloanea australis, a rainforest tree of eastern Australia
