= Grenadier (disambiguation) =

A grenadier was originally a specialized assault soldier for siege operations, later an honorific applied to many infantry military units.

Grenadier or Grenadiers may also refer to:

== Military units ==
- Grenadiers à Cheval de la Garde Impériale, a disbanded heavy cavalry regiment of France
- Grenadier Guards, a regiment in the British Army
- The Grenadiers, a regiment in the Indian Army
- The Canadian Grenadier Guards, a regiment in the Canadian Army
- 101st Grenadiers, a regiment of the former British Indian Army, now known as the Indian Grenadiers
- Potsdam Grenadiers, an 18th-century regiment of the Prussian Guard
- Swiss Grenadiers, an infantry corps of the Swiss Army

== Animals ==
- Common grenadier (Uraeginthus granatina), a species of estrildid finch (passerine birds), found in drier land of southern Africa
- Purple grenadier (Uraeginthus ianthinogaster), a species of estrildid finch (passerine birds), found in eastern Africa
- Grenadiers (fish) or rattails, deep-sea fish in the family Macrouridae

== Other uses ==
- Grenadier (manga), a Japanese anime/manga series about a female gunslinger
- The Grenadier (magazine), a wargaming magazine
- USS Grenadier, multiple ships of the United States Navy
- Grenadier Models Inc., a miniature figures manufacturer
- Grenadier (apple), an apple cultivar
- Ineos Grenadier, an off-road utility vehicle
- Les Grenadiers (Op. 207), title of a waltz by Émile Waldteufel, and named after the British regiment
- Grenadier (wargame), a 1972 Napoleonic board wargame

== See also ==
- The British Grenadiers, a traditional tune
