= Newton Wonder =

Apple cultivar

Malus domestica 'Newton Wonder'
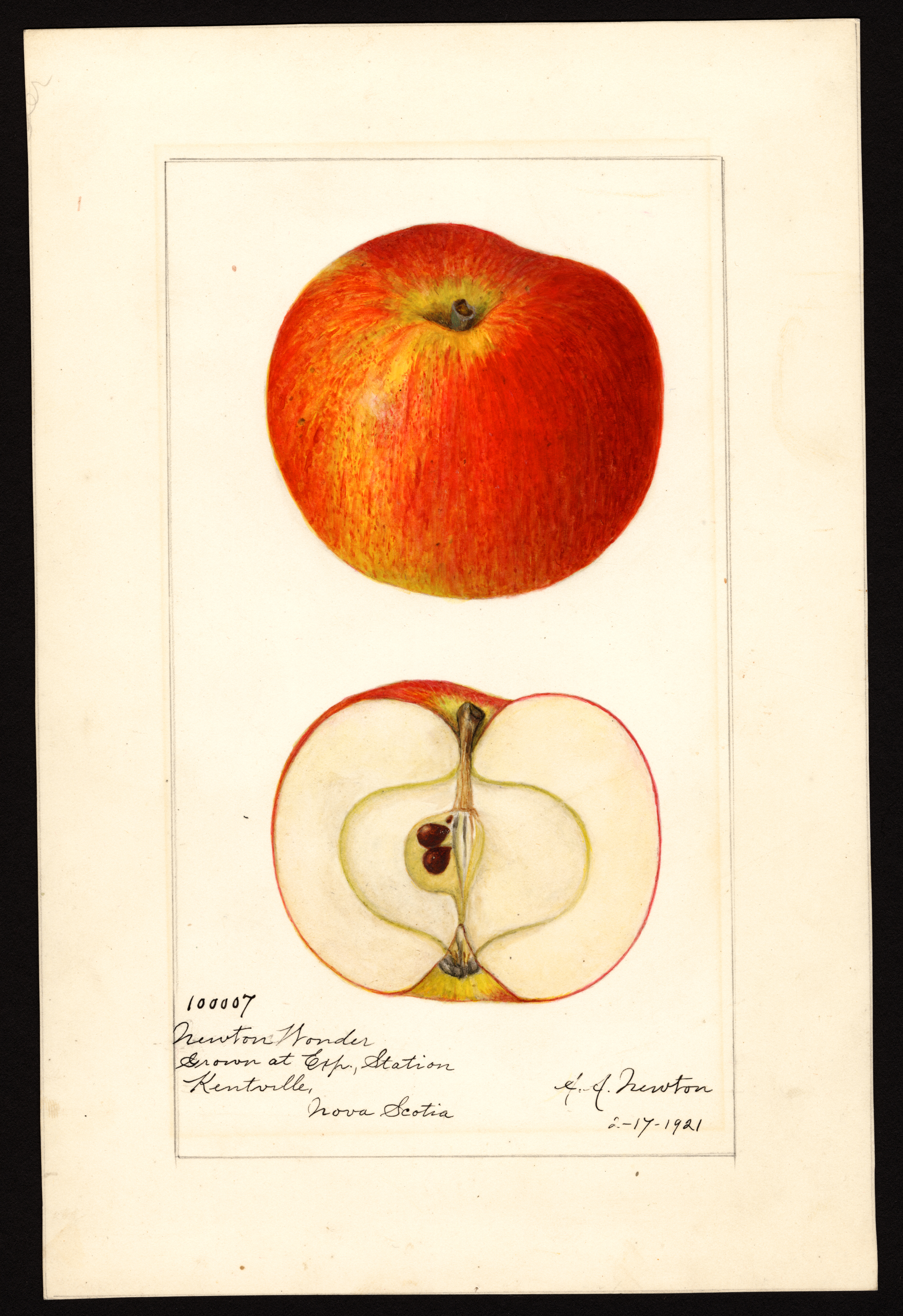
- Hybrid parentage: Possibly Dumelow's Seedling and Blenheim Orange
- Cultivar: 'Newton's Wonder'
- Origin: (United Kingdom) Kings Newton; Derbyshire; England, UK, 1870

Malus domestica Newton Wonder (commonly known as Newton's Wonder or Newton's Apple) is a cultivar of apple that is usually eaten cooked due to its sourness. The variety has a similar but slightly sweeter taste than the Bramley apple and is usually used in pies or as a preserve.

== History ==
The tree was said to have been found in the roof-gutter of the Hardinge Arms pub, King's Newton, Derbyshire as a seedling apple-tree, by William Taylor who was the landlord of the pub at the time. He then planted the seedling in the pub garden and from that tree the first Newton Wonder apple was produced. The tree is said to be a cultivar of the Blenheim Orange and the Dumelow's Seedling and in 1915 it was crossed with Blenheim Orange to create the Howgate Wonder. It received a First Class Certificate from the Royal Horticultural Society in 1887.

== Tree ==
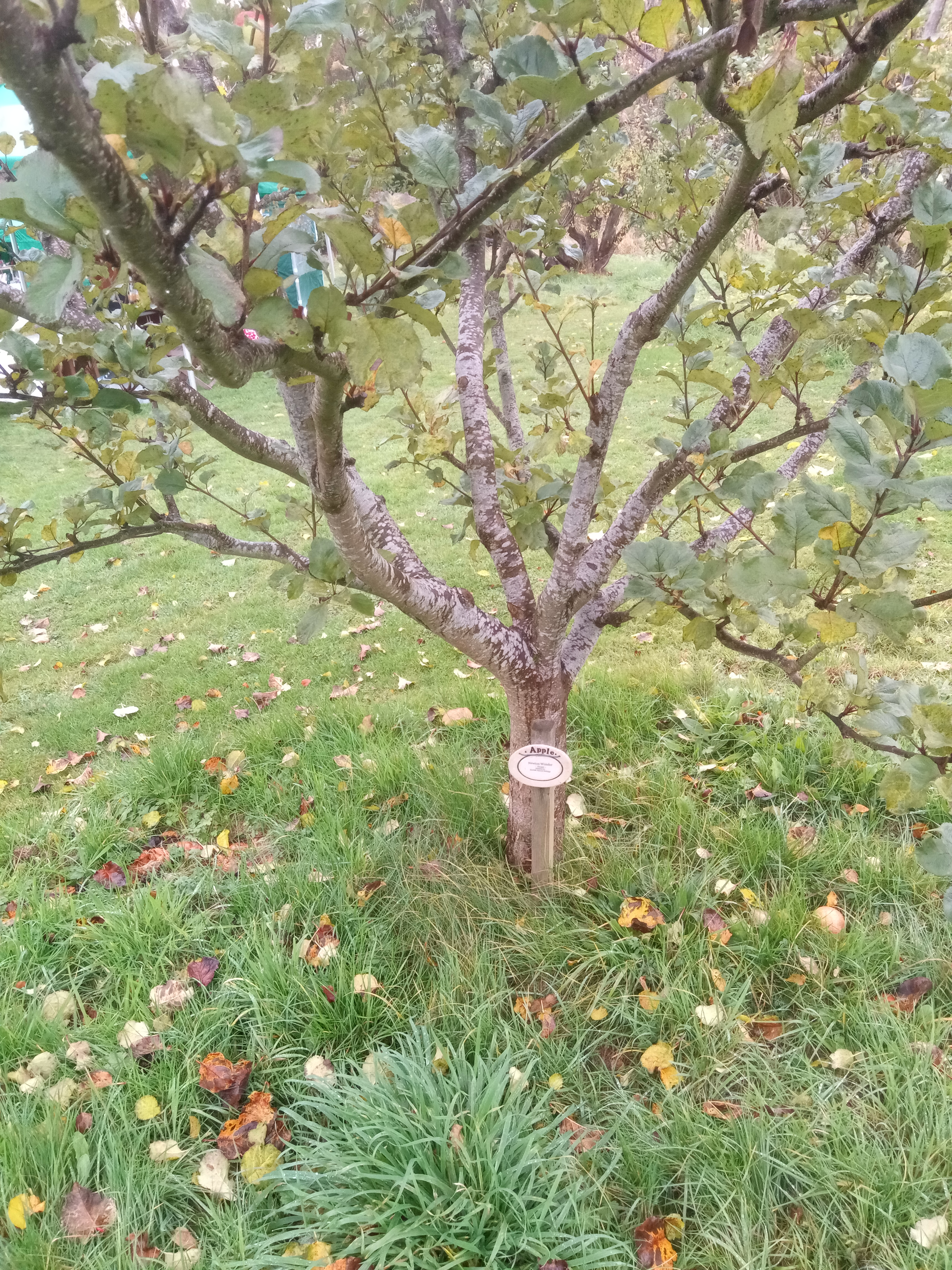
Tree in Priorwood Garden in Melrose, Scotland

The tree grows well in temperate and wet climates, producing a red and green coloured fruit with a cream-coloured flesh. The fruit tends to be very large. The tree is usually late to flower and produces a large crop which should be harvested in the late season. The tree has a general good defence to fruit tree diseases and is easy to grow and cultivate a decent-sized crop. In 1993 the tree was awarded the RHS Award of Garden Merit.

== Cooking ==
Newton Wonder is a good apple for cooking or for making juice. When cooking the apple is reduced to a puree which may be added to pies, tarts or used as a chutney. The apple produces a sharp but slightly sweet taste when cooked and is best used when ripened in the late season. The crop can be stored for at least 3 months safely retaining its flavour.
