= Lathcoats Farm Shop =

English farm shop

- Type: Private
- Founded: Galleywood, Essex (1912)
- Founder: Lawrence Taylor
- Key people: Stephen Taylor; Philip Taylor
- Website: Lathcoats Farm Shop

Lathcoats Farm Shop, often shortened to just "Lathcoats" is a family run farm shop, situated in Galleywood, Essex, England. It is based on Beehive Lane, where it was established in 1912 by Lawrence Taylor.

== History ==
In 1912, Lawrence Taylor planted the first fruit trees on Lathcoats Farm's 55 hectares. Lathcoats Farm has been in the Taylor family for four generations. Lawrence's only son, Maurice, then took over Lathcoats Farm. Lathcoats Farm Shop is currently run by Maurice's two sons, Philip and Stephen and grandson James who is trained as physiotherapist but has taken the role of chief fruit grower, he is particularly pleased with his raspberry crop of 2020.

The Bee Shed Coffee shop was established in April 2013 and has been run by the managers Lien Douglas and Clare Redington, amongst many other loyal team members.

Lathcoats Farm Shop was set up by Maurice Taylor in the late 1960s.

== Apples ==
Lathcoats Farm Shop is well known for supplying over 40 apple varieties, including and supplying the local community as well as the wholesale market.

=== Apple varieties ===
Lathcoats Farm Shop grows and stocks over 40 apple varieties, including: D'Arcy Spice, Queen, Chelmsford Wonder, Adams Pearmain, Cornish Gilliflower, Temptation, Topaz, Meridian, Honeycrisp and Discovery.

=== Apple Day ===
Apple Day is an annual event that officially takes place on 21 October each year. Lathcoats Farm Shop has been celebrating Apple Day for almost 20 years. The event is held at Lathcoats Farm, where locally grown apples and other fruit can be tasted.

=== Rent a Tree ===
A scheme was set up in 2000 by Lathcoats Farm Shop to enable people in the community to rent a tree. This means that people can pick the fruit from their tree even if they don't have space to grow one themselves.
