= Alfriston (apple) =

Apple cultivar

Malus domestica 'Alfriston'
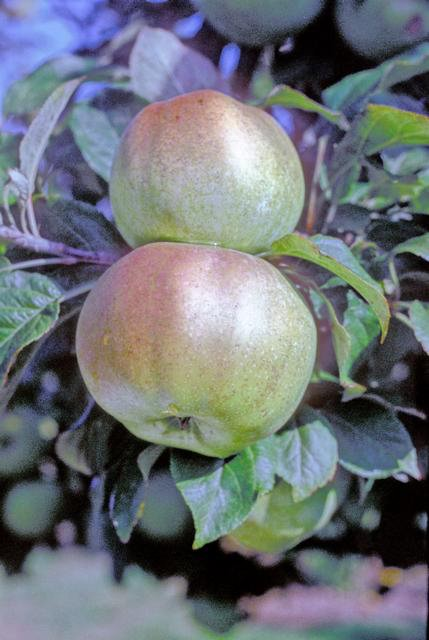
- Genus: Malus
- Species: M. domestica
- Cultivar: 'Alfriston'

'Alfriston' is a large cooking apple (83x76mm). Raised at Uckfield, Sussex, England in the late 1700s. Skin greenish yellow on the shaded side, tinged with orange next to sun. Stalk short and stout. Flesh, yellowish white, crisp, juicy, sugary, and briskly flavored. Picking October. Use November to April. The tree is a vigorous grower. Synonyms: Lord Gwydyr's, Oldakers New, Shepherd's Pippin, Shepherd's Seedling. Award of Merit from Royal Horticultural Society in 1920.
