= Papirovka =

Apple cultivar

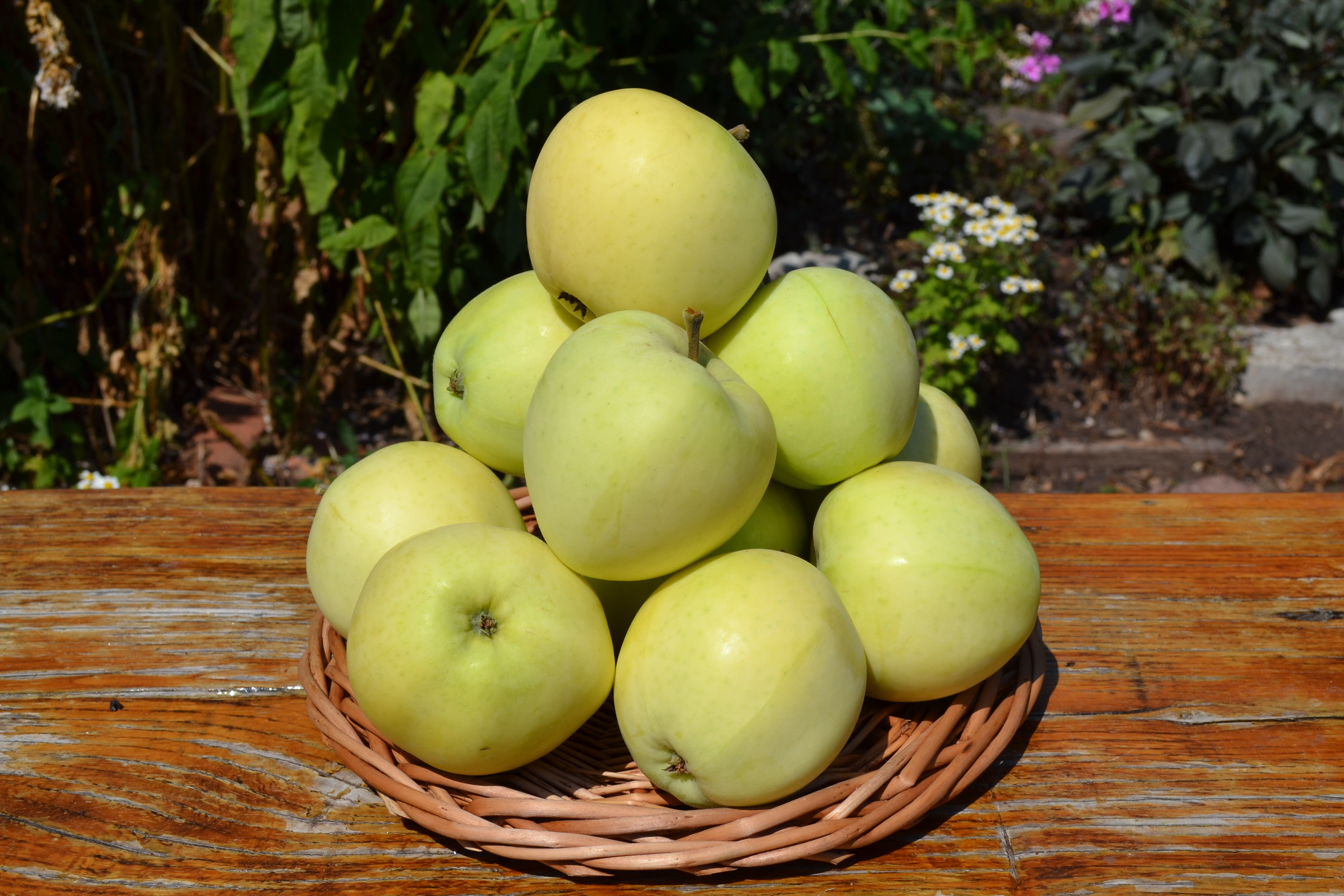
- Hybrid parentage: Chance seedling
- Origin: Eastern Europe, before 1949

Papirovka (Polish: Papierówka) is a cold-resistant early-ripening apple (Malus domestica) cultivar grown across Central and Eastern Europe and the Baltics. Along with Antonovka and others, it is one of five cultivars that comprise half of the apple production in the former USSR, and is one of the most popular early-summer varieties in Poland. It is prone to bruising, so it needs careful handling and storage.

Papirovka apples have also been called early Paper apples or Polish paper apples. Some sources consider the papirovka to be identical to the White Transparent, but in Russia the two cultivars are considered distinct. Compared to the White Transparent, Papirovka apples are larger, more sour, and without any blush in their yellow-white color.

== See also ==
- List of apple cultivars
