= Hawley apple =

Apple cultivar

Hawley
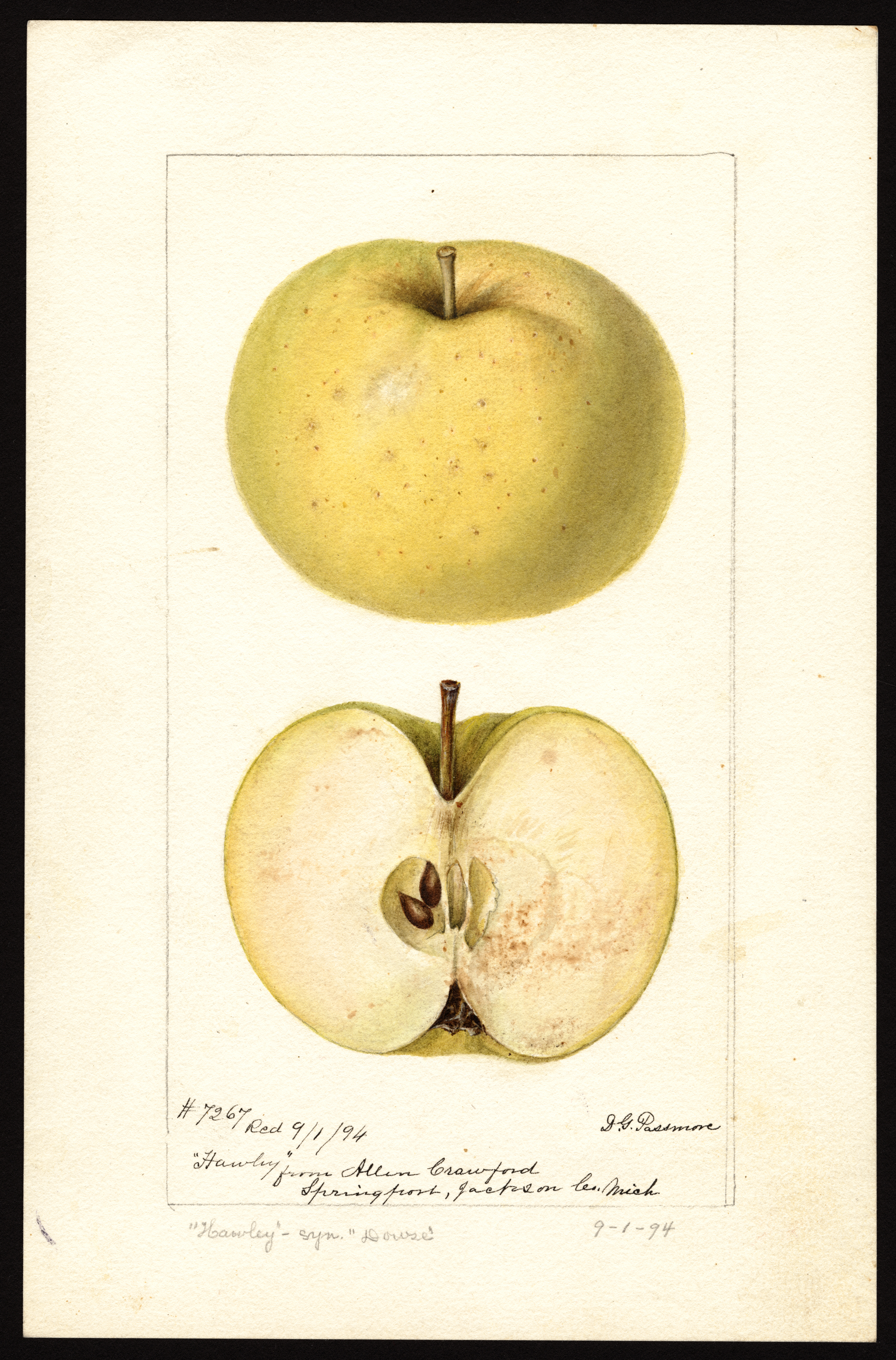
- Genus: Malus
- Species: M. domestica
- Cultivar: Hawley
- Origin: New York, about 1750

Hawley is a large yellow apple cultivar that is used for eating fresh. Although the fruit are delicious, the tree is not very productive, and the fruit are often blemished or rot at the core. It is therefore good as a home orchard tree, but not commercially profitable. The Hawthornden apple has also been incorrectly known as Hawley.
