= Bramley apple =

Apple cultivar

Malus domestica (Bramley's Seedling)
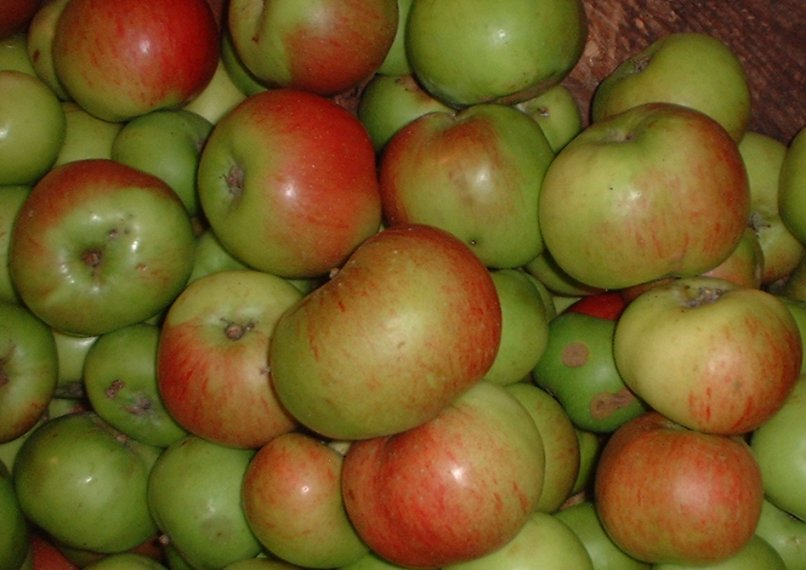
- Bramley's Seedling apples, British Columbia, Canada
- Cultivar: Bramley's Seedling
- Origin: Southwell, Nottinghamshire, England, UK, 1809

Bramley's Seedling, commonly known as the Bramley apple, or simply Bramley, Bramleys or Bramley's, is an English cultivar of apple (Malus domestica) that is usually eaten cooked due to its sourness. The variety comes from a pip planted by Mary Ann Brailsford. The Concise Household Encyclopedia states, "Some people eat this apple raw in order to cleanse the palate, but Bramley's seedling is essentially the fruit for tart, pie, or dumpling." Once cooked, however, it has a lighter flavour. A peculiarity of the variety is that when cooked it becomes golden and fluffy.

== Tree ==
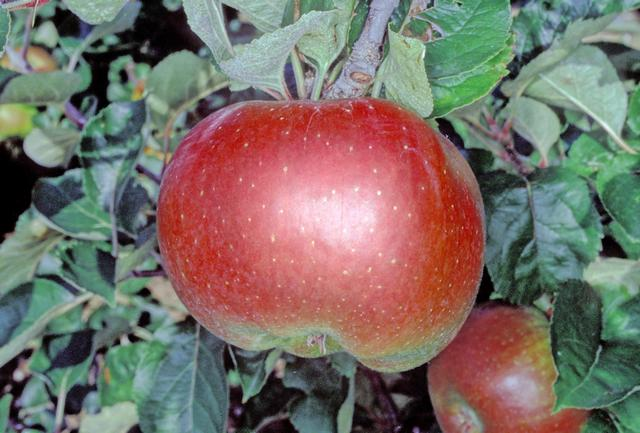
Crimson Bramley, a bud mutation of Bramley

Bramley's Seedling apple trees are large, vigorous, spreading and long-lived. They tolerate some shade. The apples are very large, two or three times the weight of a typical dessert apple. They are flat with a vivid green skin that becomes red on the side that receives direct sunlight. The tree is resistant to apple scab and mildew and does best when grown as a standard in somewhat heavy clay soil. It is a heavy and regular bearer; the apple, nicknamed the "King of Covent Garden", is the only British cooking apple produced all year round.

As a triploid, the tree has sterile pollen. It needs a pollinator but cannot pollinate in return, so it is normally grown with two other varieties of apple for pollination. It has won many awards and currently holds the Royal Horticultural Society's Award of Garden Merit (H4).

Most of the stock of Bramley's Seedling commercially available is slightly different in its growth habit and other characteristics from the original tree, probably because of one or more chance mutations that occurred unnoticed over the years. Plants cloned from the still-surviving (then 180-year-old) tree by tissue culture in 1990 have proved to be much more compact and free-branching than the widely available commercial stock. The cloning work was done to preserve the original by scientists at the University of Nottingham, including Edward Cocking, because the original tree was suffering from old age and was under attack by honey fungus. Twelve of the cloned trees now grow in the University grounds; one was also planted beside the old tree at Southwell, but was cut down when it was 10 years old. In 2024 the artist Dan Llywelyn Hall painted a portrait of the tree in support of a campaign to help support the tree in its declining years.

== History ==
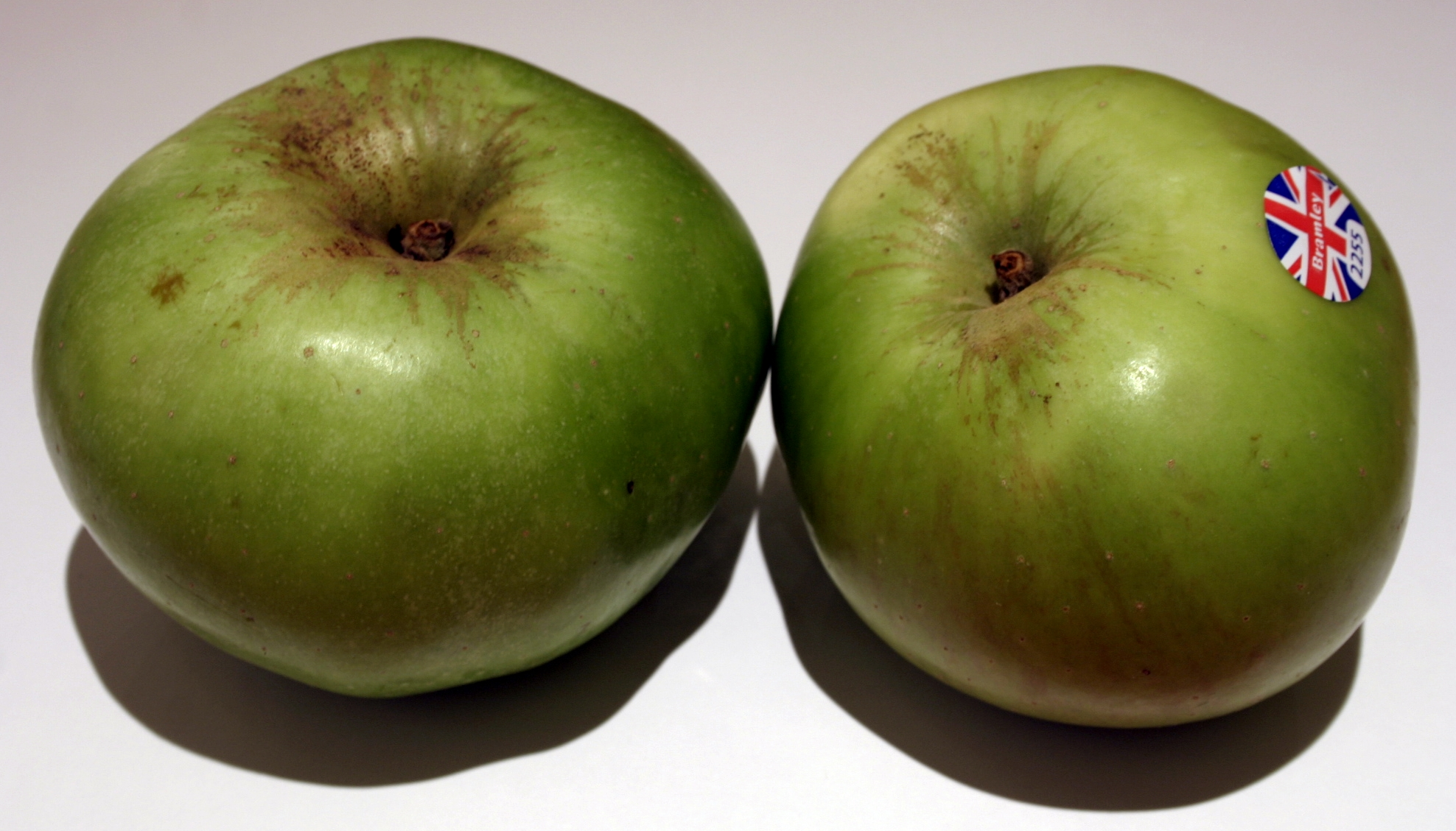
Bramley's Seedling apples from Nottinghamshire

The first Bramley's Seedling tree grew from pips planted by Mary Ann Brailsford in her garden when she was a young girl in Southwell, Nottinghamshire, UK in 1809. Mary left the house when she married and possibly never saw the apples that were produced. She died in 1852 never knowing that "her" seedling was to become famous. The tree she had planted in the garden was later included in the purchase of the cottage by a local butcher, Matthew Bramley, in 1846. In 1856, a local nurseryman, Henry Merryweather, asked if he could take cuttings from the tree and start to sell the apples. Bramley agreed but insisted that the apples should bear his name.

On 31 October 1862, the first recorded sale of a Bramley was noted in Merryweather's accounts. He sold "three Bramley apples for 2/- to Mr Geo Cooper of Upton Hall". On 6 December 1876, the Bramley was highly commended at the Royal Horticultural Society's Fruit Committee exhibition.

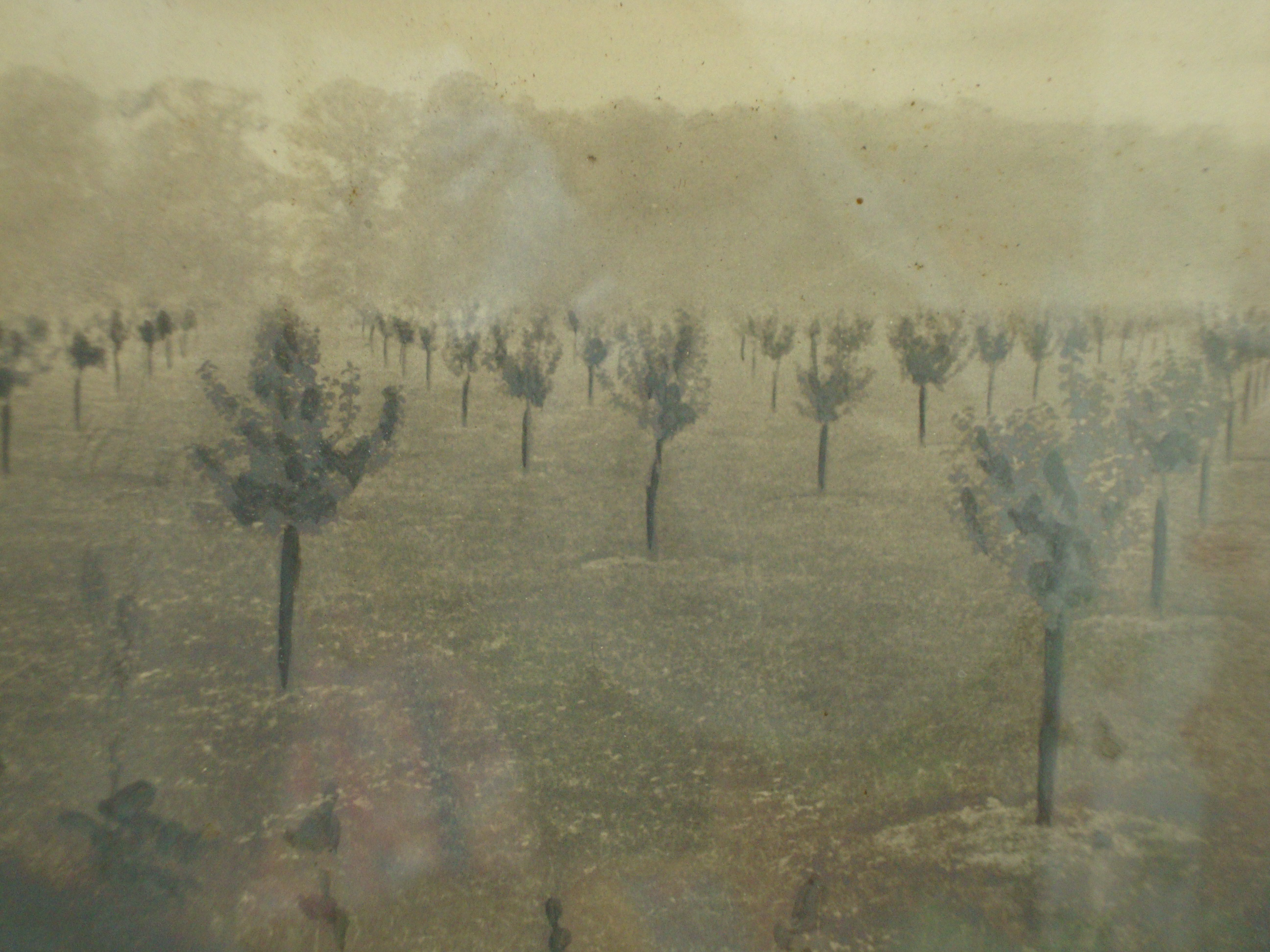
Taken by John Ralph Starkey at Norwood Park in 1910, this photo shows the Bramley Seedlings about 10 years old

As a young man Henry Merryweather worked as a gardener on the nearby Norwood Park Estate in Nottingham, and when John Ralph Starkey bought the hall, gardens, and pasture in 1880, he turned to Henry Merryweather for advice about which apples and fruit he should be planting on his acreage. The Bramley Apple was suggested and the first commercial orchard of Bramley was established in 1910 at Maythorne Orchard, close to the Lower Kirklington Road on what is now a golf course.

In 1900, the original tree was knocked over during violent storms; it survived, and is still bearing fruit two centuries after it was planted. It was reported in 2016 that the tree was suffering from a fungal infection and could be dying, but it was still producing fruit in 2024, though said to be neglected. The variety is now the most important cooking apple in England and Wales, with 13.5 square miles, 95% of total culinary apple orchards in 2007.

The Bramley is cultivated almost exclusively in the British Isles, though also produced by a few United States farms, and can be found in Canada, Australia and Japan.

At the 2009 bi-centenary, a special display was presented at the Harrogate Autumn Flower Show by the great-granddaughter of Henry Merryweather.

The town of Southwell hosts many celebrations of the Bramley Apple, including the Bramley Apple Festival launched in 2011.

On the third Saturday in October, Southwell Minster hosts the Opening Ceremony and the Food & Drink Festival. The Bramley Apple Inn was a pub a few doors away from the original apple tree. It is now an Indian restaurant. In 2018, 75–77 Church Street was bought by Nottingham Trent University to preserve the building and the tree for posterity.

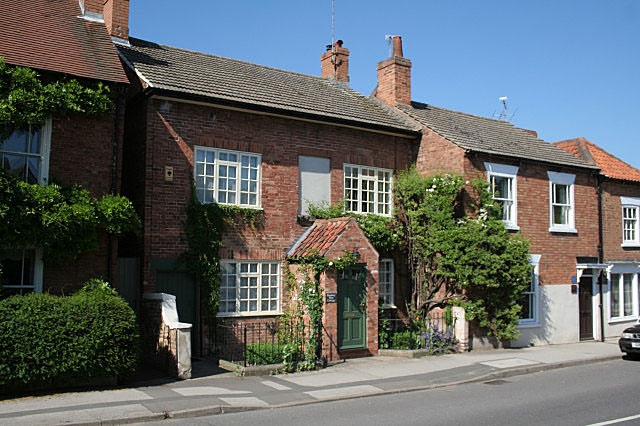
Bramley Tree Cottage (No. 73, left) with blue plaque visible on house doorway to right (No. 75–77)

The tree is not open to the public, but can be visited by appointment.

A blue plaque on the house in Southwell now commemorates the apple, and in 2009 a stained glass window commemorating the 200th anniversary of the planting of the tree was installed in Southwell Minster.

== Armagh Bramleys ==
Bramley apples from County Armagh in Northern Ireland have Protected Geographical Indication status within the European Union. The apples have a tarter taste than those grown in England. Over 40,000 tonnes are produced annually.

== Cooking ==
Bramleys work well in pies, cooked fruit compotes and salads, crumbles, and other dessert dishes. They are also used for chutneys but only form a base for cider, due to their acidity. Whole Bramley apples, cored and filled with dried fruit, baked, and served with custard is an inexpensive and traditional British dessert. Bramleys are also used for apple sauce.

Regardless of the dish, Bramley apples are generally cooked in the same basic way. First the fruit is peeled and then sliced, and the pieces covered in lemon juice (or some other acidic juice) to stop them turning brown. Sugar is often added. In pies and crumbles, the fruit is simply covered with the topping and baked; the moisture in the apples is sufficient to soften them while cooking. The flavour may be spiced, according to taste, with cloves, mixed spice or cinnamon. To make apple sauce, the apples are sliced and then stewed with sugar and lemon juice in a saucepan.

Bramley's Seedling apples are favoured for producing a jelly which is very pale in colour. Because the tree is a heavy cropper and liable to glut, it is a fine candidate for the domestic production of fruit wine, alone or with other fruits, and cider if mixed with a sweeter Cox or similar.
