= Campanino =

Apple cultivar

'Campanino'
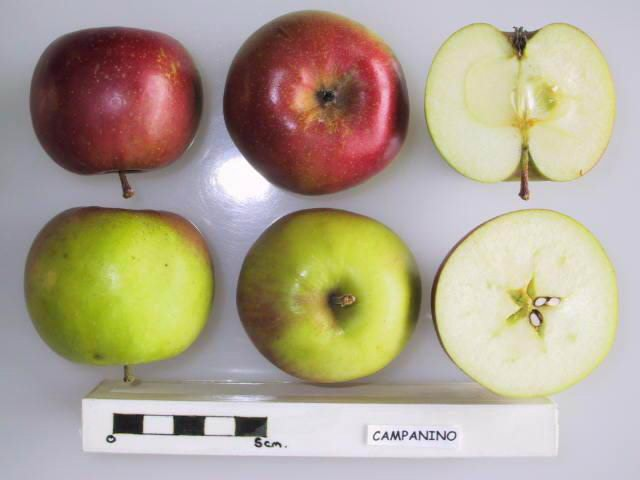
- Species: Malus pumila
- Hybrid parentage: Chance seedling
- Cultivar: 'Campanino'
- Origin: Province of Modena, Italy

Campanino (Italian: mela campanina; in the Emilian dialect Mirandolese póm campanèn, transl. tiny bell apple), also known as mela modenese, transl. Modenese apple, or mela della nonna, transl. grandmother's apple, is a variety of the domestic apple. Thanks to its long shelf life, the Campanino has been popular not only in Italy but also in export to countries such as Germany.

Campanino apples are included in the list of Italian traditional foodstuffs (Prodotti agroalimentari tradizionali – PAT) from the Emilia-Romagna region, and in the Emilia-Romagna Regional Voluntary Database of Agricultural Genetic Resources (code RER V019).

The cultivar is also widespread in the Veneto region, where it is called campanìn (code GM27) or Modena apple (code GM47).

== History ==
The ancient origins of this variety are not known. An early reference was in 1751 when Francesco Argelati from Bologna described the character of Bartolomea Gualandi as

una delle più belle e vaghe giovani di Pisa, la quale ancora ventriquattr'anni non aveva, fresca e rotondetta che pareva una mela modenese.

one of the most beautiful and vague young girls of Pisa, who is not yet 24 years old, fresh and round and looked like an apple from Modena

In 1815, Italian pomologist Georges Gallesio described a seedling found in the province of Modena as "Modena apple". In 1877 historian Don Felice Ceretti from Mirandola, published an article in a local periodical in which he spoke about "apples called campanini which are widely stocked in autumn and transported to Venice and other cities".

After the Second World War, cultivation of Campanino apples decreased in favour of other varieties that are more productive, easier to grow, and more appreciated by consumers. Historian Vilmo Cappi (1918–2013) wrote that the Campanino apple was disappearing because it was being replaced by more commercial varieties and types of apples. There are still those, however, who prefer the fruit since it can last all winter long with its fragrance kept intact while its clean and white pulp looks like marble.

== Description ==
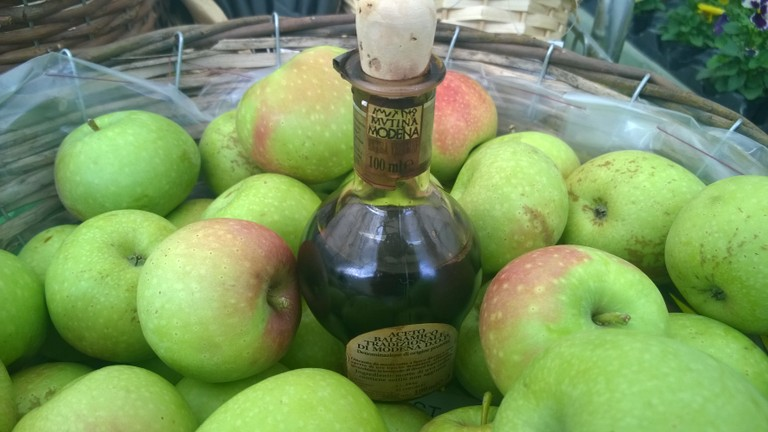
Traditional Balsamic Vinegar of Modena and Campanino apples

The fruits of the Campanino apple tree are small, usually symmetrical, and usually spheroidal (about 64 millimetres (2.5 in) in diameter by 58 millimetres (2.3 in) in height), with a weight of about 85–95 grams (3.0–3.4 oz). The skin is thick and not very waxy, of a yellow-green colour which becomes red-green when the fruit is exposed to sunlight. The flesh is greenish-white, very firm, and sugary. It is also aromatic and slightly acidic.

A scientific study carried out by the University of Bologna on characteristics of five ancient varieties of apple highlighted Campanino's qualities. It contains high amounts of antioxidants (up to four times more than Golden Delicious apples), high content of pectin and polyphenols, as well as ascorbic acid (vitamin C).

The flowering season occurs in April–May, and the apple can be harvested for about a month from the beginning of October. Matured Campaninas have red skin colouration especially after they have been exposed to the sun for 5–7 days: for this reason Campanina apple is also called as the "Annurca apple of Northern Italy".

Unlike other varieties, Campanino apples can be easily preserved for six months without any use of refrigeration. This characteristic has allowed the survival of Campanino variety until today.

== Growing area ==
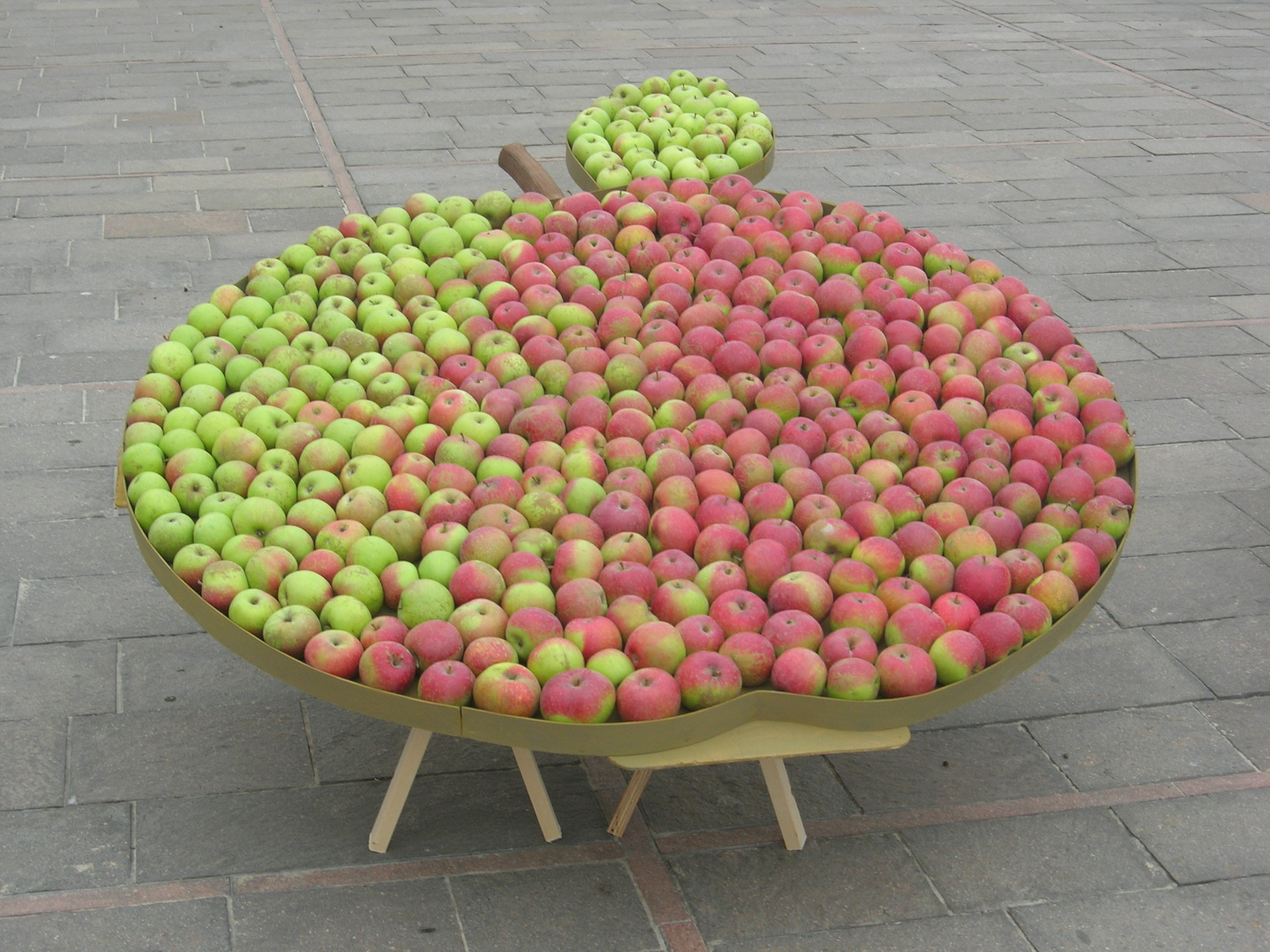
Exposition of Campanine apples during the annual festival held in San Possidonio (Modena)

The Campanino apple growing area is located in the Northeast Italy, in the provinces of Ferrara, Mantua, Modena, Reggio Emilia and Rovigo. The variety is also widespread in the province of Venice, where it is known as "Modenese apple".

Main municipalities where Campanino grows:

- Province of Ferrara: Argenta, Ferrara e Portomaggiore
- Province of Mantua: Carbonara di Po, Pegognaga, Poggio Rusco, Quistello, San Benedetto Po, San Giacomo delle Segnate, San Giovanni del Dosso, Roverbella, and Schivenoglia
- Province of Modena: all the municipalities of Po plain
- Province of Reggio Emilia: Bagnolo in Piano, Campagnola Emilia, Correggio, Fabbrico, Novellara, Reggio Emilia, Rio Saliceto, Rolo, and San Martino in Rio
- Province of Rovigo: Adria, Badia Polesine, Canaro, Costa di Rovigo, Crespino, Lendinara, Rovigo, San Martino di Venezze, and Trecenta
- Province of Venice: Dolo, Fossalta, Jesolo, Mira, Mirano, Noale, Portogruaro, Salzano, Scorzè, and Venice

== Use ==
Campanino is often used as a cooking apple since its flesh remains intact and compact even after cooking. It is also excellent when eaten fresh as it retains all its nutrients even months after being harvested.

The Campanino apple can be eaten raw, but because of its thick skin, people prefer it for cooking, preferably in a casserole with a little water, and a simple dusting of sugar, which is then caramelized in the oven.

The apple's pulp is used to make jam, mostarda (including Mostarda di Mantova), and savór, or ingredients for apple pie or pancakes. Traditional mostarda, a sweet-and-hot condiment made from Campanina apples or quinces, sugar and mustard, has been served with boiled meats as far back as the Middle Ages.

== See also ==
- Cooking apple
- List of apple cultivars

== Bibliography ==
- La mela campanina di Modena. Finale Emilia: Istituto Calvi. 2014.
- V. Solaroli (9–16 October 1949). Scheda pomologica del melo campanino. Ferrara: Vallecchi editore.
