= Ballyfatten (apple) =

Apple cultivar

Malus domestica 'Ballyfatten'
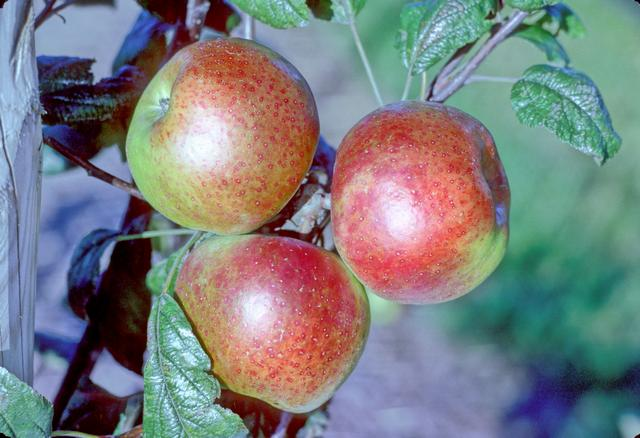
- Ballyfatten apples
- Species: Malus domestica
- Cultivar: 'Ballyfatten'
- Origin: Ireland

Ballyfatten, sometimes stylized as Bally Fatten is a cultivar of domesticated apple. The Ballyfatten apple originated in Ballyfatten, County Tyrone, Ireland, in 1802. This particular cultivar of apple has long been popular in that area for its use in cooking and baking.

== Appearance and flavour ==
The fruit of a Ballyfatten apple tree is medium to large in size, with a round-conical shape. The skin is green with a strong red flush, and it is often dry with a mottled texture, while the flesh is firm, white, and slightly acidic. The apple's lenticels may be prominent and circled in red.

While Ballyfatten apples can be used directly after picking, they tend to be quite tart; a more common practice is for the apples to be put in storage and preserved, in which they sweeten rapidly when stored properly. Ballyfatten apples can be eaten raw, but they are often classified as a cooking apple. The firm, white flesh can be cooked down to a creamy, pleasant puree.

== External links and references ==
- Some information
