= Glockenapfel =

Malus domestica Borkh 'Glockenapfel'
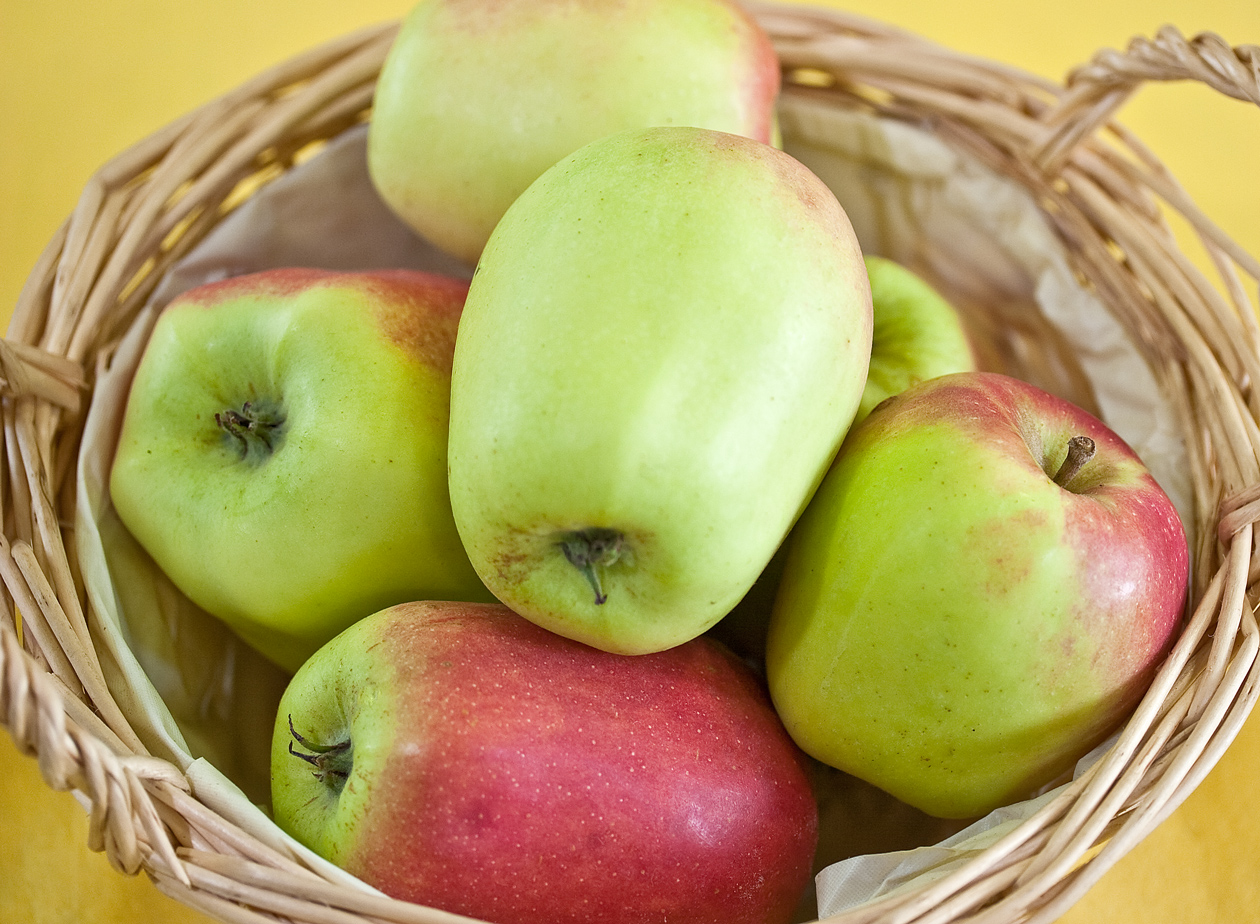
- Species: Malus domestica
- Origin: Switzerland/South Germany

The Glockenapfel (English: bell apple) (also known as Weißer Winterglockenapfel, Altländer Glockenapfel, Schweizer Glockenapfel, Echter Glocken) is the name of an old apple variety introduced in the 17th century that is believed to have originated in Switzerland, southern Germany, or along the Lower Elbe and is now widespread throughout Germany.

== Fruit characteristics ==
The apple is bell-shaped with a green-yellow base color that occasionally takes on a reddish blush. It has a tart and refreshing taste with slightly juicy flesh. The apple is ready for picking in October and becomes ripe for consumption from December onwards, making it a winter apple. It can be stored in cold storage until June. Occasionally, it is cultivated as a commercial fruit variety. The fruit is mildly susceptible to apple scab.

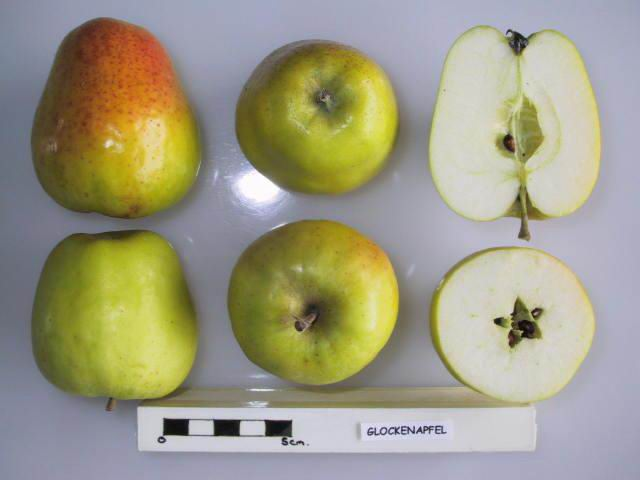
Cross section of Glockenapfel

A very high value of 1430 mg/l was measured in analyses for polyphenols, which were funded by donations. Polyphenols are health-promoting and can render allergenic substances harmless in apples.
