= Edward Cocking =

British botanist (1931–2023)

Edward Charles Daniel Cocking FRS (26 September 1931 – 14 July 2023), known as Ted Cocking, was a British plant scientist, and Emeritus Professor at University of Nottingham.

He was on the Board of Trustees of Royal Botanic Gardens, Kew, from 1983 to 1993. He was on the Board of Directors of Lawes Agricultural Trust Company and was a foreign fellow of the National Academy of Agricultural Sciences. He gave many lectures of the subject of Nitrogen fixation including to the Manchester Literary & Philosophical Society THE RAMSDEN LECTURE, where notes of his lecture may be viewed.
