= Dumelow's Seedling =

Apple cultivar

'Dumelow's Seedling'
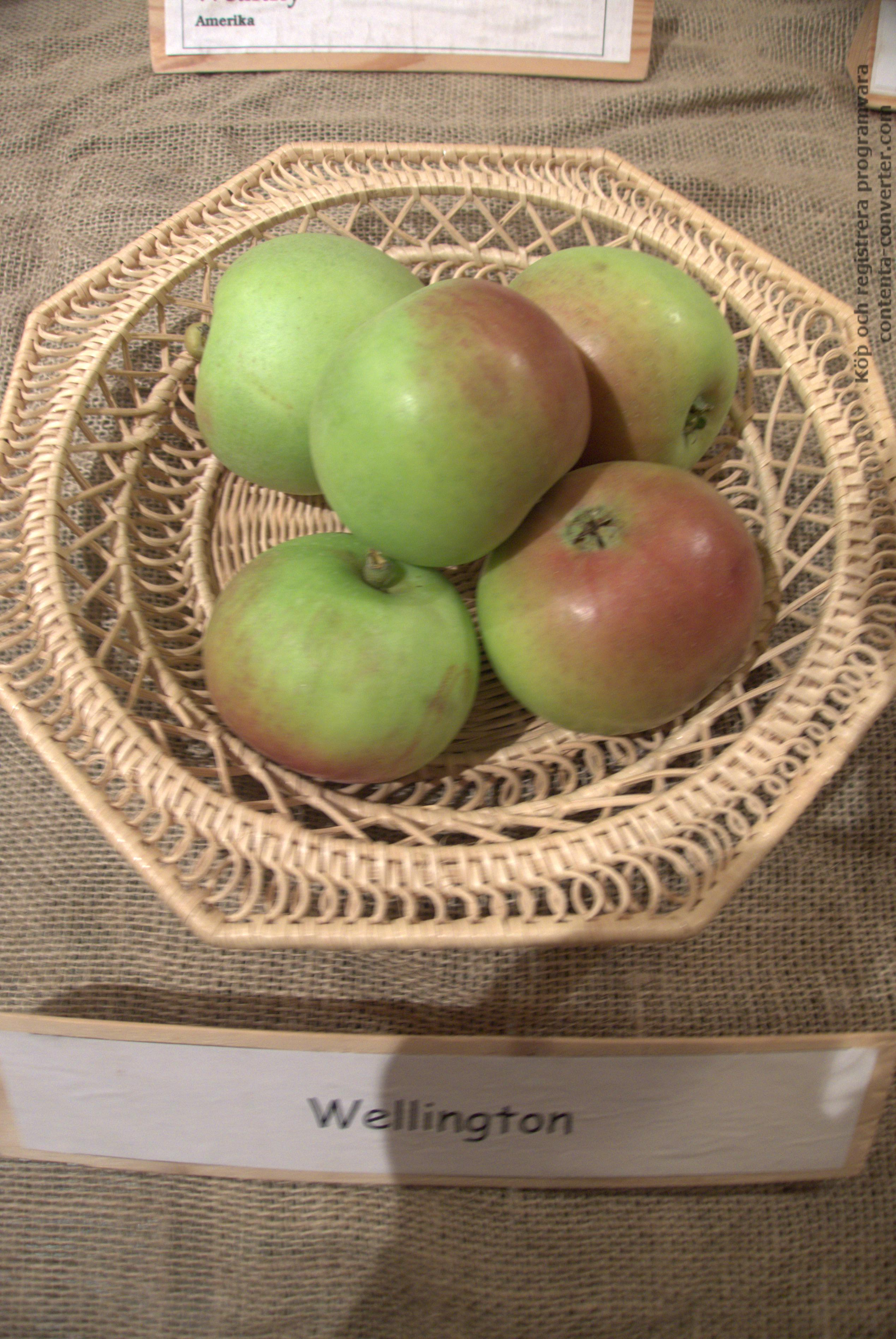
- Cultivar: 'Dumelow's Seedling'
- Origin: England, before 1800

Dumelow's Seedling is a cultivar of domesticated apple that originated at Shackerstone in Leicestershire where it was grown by Richard Dumeller in 1800. It is known by many other names including 'Dumelow's Crab', 'Wellington', 'Doncklaer', 'Beauty', and 'Belle de Vennes'. The fruit is not ready for harvest until October, being one of the last of the season, and keeps well into the next year. Though inferior for use as a dessert apple it cooks well and in early-20th century England was one of the most valuable varieties of cooking apple.

== History ==
The variety was first raised by Richard Dumeller (or Dumelow) of Hop John's Hill near Shackerstone in Leicestershire. The original tree had been growing there since at least 1800. It was first exhibited under the name Dumelow's Crab in 1818 and had become known as the Wellington by 1820 when it was exhibited at the Royal Horticultural Society. The alternative name is believed to have arisen from its cultivation at Wellington, Shropshire though it was later incorrectly attributed to the Duke of Wellington under which name it has also been known.

The apple is derived from the Northern Greening crossed with an unknown variety. Dumelow's Seedling is parent to the Hounslow Wonder, Cottenham Seedling, Baron Ward, Newton Wonder, Belvoir Seedling, Monarch and Lane's Prince Albert. Dumelow's Seedling is known by more than 50 alternative names that include 'Dumelow's Crab', 'Wellington', 'Doncklaer', 'Beauty', and 'Belle de Vennes'.

== Description ==
The fruit is described as a medium "flat-round" and is typically around 52 mm (2.0 in) in height and 67 mm (2.6 in) in width. The apples are whiteish-yellow with red mottling and the skin is tough. The fruit is very firm with a crisp, juicy flesh that is slightly yellow. As a cooking apple it is suited to culinary dishes but for eating fresh is inferior to red apples such as Baldwin or Sutton. It was regarded in early 20th-century England as one of the most valuable varieties of cooking apple. Dumelow's Seedling apples typically contain around 12% sugar, 12g per litre of acid and 4mg per 100g of vitamin C.

Dumelow's Seedling flowers in mid-May and is ready for harvest in early October. The tree is most productive in alternate years. It is one of the last apples of the season and keeps well; retaining its flavour in storage until April and sometimes until the first rhubarb and gooseberry harvest is ready (May in the United Kingdom).

The young wood of the tree is speckled and is resistant to canker. The tree is a strong grower, with an upright, round spread of somewhat drooping branches. The bark is a light-brownish red with olive green and the leaves are relatively large and broad.
