= Hawthornden apple =

Apple cultivar

Hawthornden
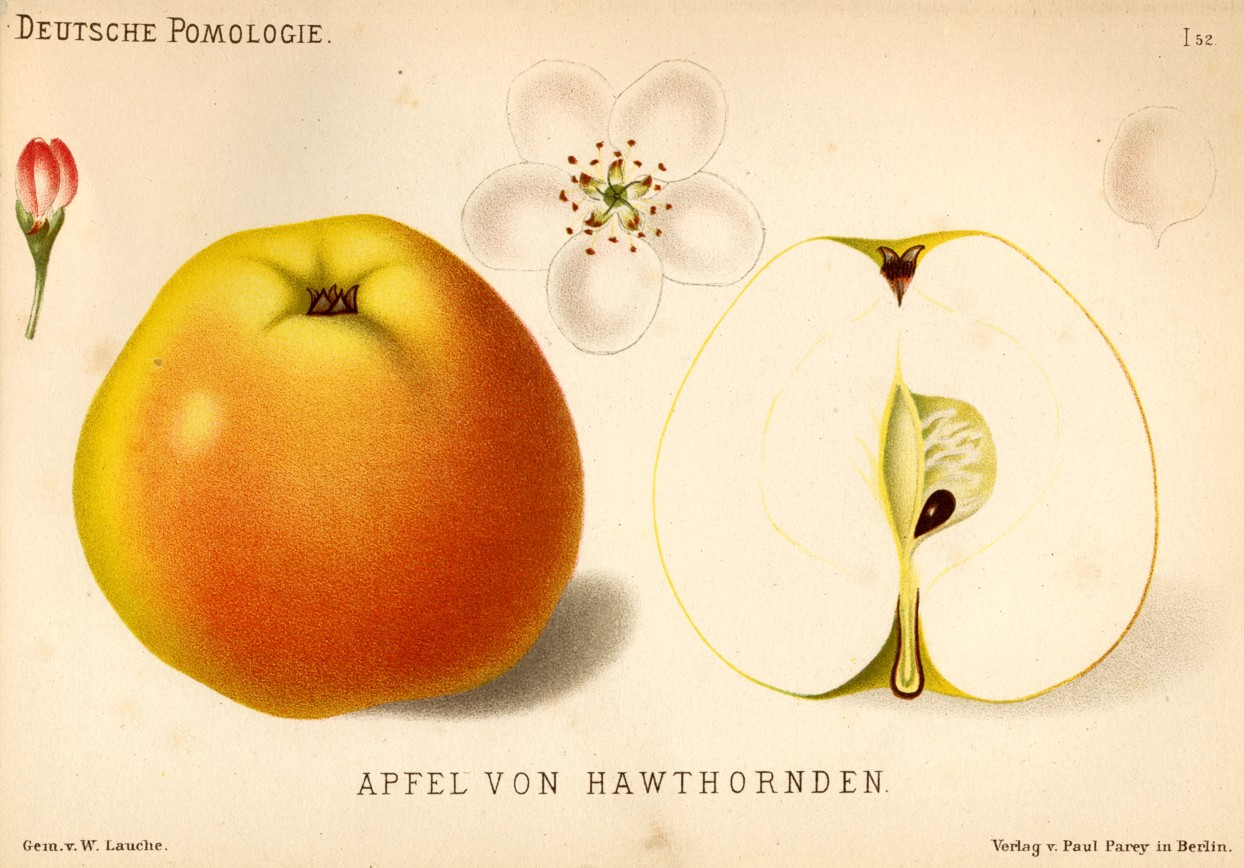
- Genus: Malus
- Species: M. domestica
- Cultivar: Hawthornden
- Origin: Scotland, pre 1780

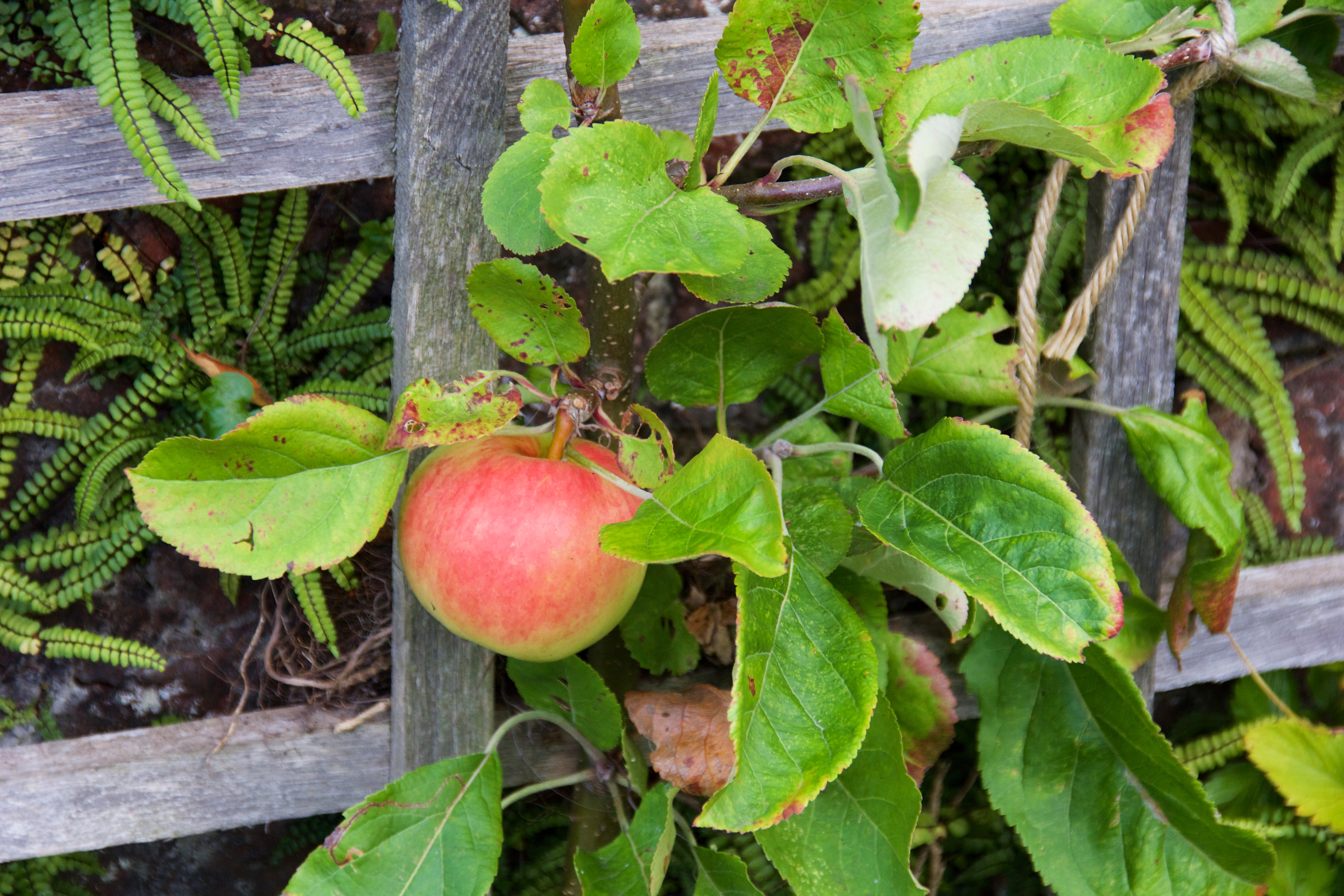

Hawthornden or Hawthorndean is an apple cultivar that is used for cooking. It is also known as Wheeler's Kernel, Lincolnshire Pippin, and Lord Kingston, and has been incorrectly known as Maiden's Blush and Hawley.
