= Søren Bough =

Norwegian sport shooter (1873–1939)

Personal information
- Born: 19 June 1873 Drammen, Norway
- Died: 11 November 1939 (aged 66) Drammen, Norway

Sport
- Sport: Sports shooting

Søren Bough (19 June 1873 – 11 November 1939) was a Norwegian sport shooter. He was born in Drammen, and his club was Drammen Skytterlag. He competed in military rifle at the 1912 Summer Olympics in Stockholm.
