= USS Grenadier =

Two vessels of the United States Navy have borne the name USS Grenadier, named in honor of the grenadiers, a family (Macrouridae) of soft-finned deep-sea fishes with long, tapering bodies and short, pointed tails, also known as rattails.

- The first USS Grenadier (SS-210), was a Tambor-class submarine, commissioned in 1941 and was scuttled in 1943.
- The second USS Grenadier (SS-525), was a Tench-class submarine, commissioned in 1951 and struck in 1973.
