= Red Astrachan =

Apple cultivar

'Red Astrachan' apple
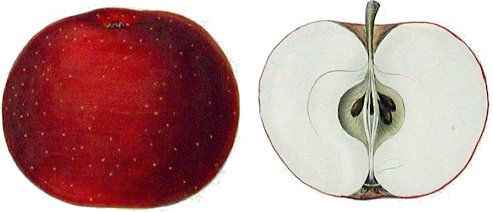
- Cultivar: 'Red Astrachan'
- Origin: Russia or Sweden

Red Astrachan is a cultivar of domesticated apple of either Russian or Swedish origin, which is an early season apple, juicy, tart and mealy texture with pleasant flavour, and use for eating, cooking and cider. It is medium-sized, crimson colored. As all the early season apples, it is not good for storage. It is known by several other names including 'Abe Lincoln', 'American Red', and 'Waterloo'.

- Typical size: width 77 mm, height 61 mm, stalk 18-31 mm.
- Tree vigorous, upright, productive, hardy.
- Flesh white often tinged with red, crisp, tender, juicy, aromatic, subacid.

== Growing tips ==
This cultivar needs rich soil, moderate watering, good drainage, big spacing and full sun. Needs pruning. Susceptible to apple scab, fireblight, frost, apple rust disease, black rot, bitter rot and pests. This plant is attractive to bees, butterflies and birds. Flowers are fragrant.

Red Astrachan
----	When to pick	When ripe enough to eat	Latest cold storage limit
In Northern states	July 22 - Aug. 15	July 30 - Sept. 3	Sept. 20
In Southern States	July 17 - Aug. 15	July 23 - Aug. 3	Sept. 1

== History ==
The Red Astrachan as recorded in the 1870s was a dark-red apple; a variant, the Summer King, was "a bright scarlet".
