= When the Bough Breaks =

Topics referred to by the same term

When the Bough Breaks may refer to:

== Literature ==
- "When the bough breaks the cradle will fall", a line from the nursery rhyme "Rock-a-bye Baby"
- When the Bough Breaks and Other Stories, a 1924 collection of short stories by Naomi Mitchison
- When the Bough Breaks (Duncan novel), a 1973 novel by Lois Duncan
- When the Bough Breaks (Kellerman novel), a 1985 novel by Jonathan Kellerman
- When the Bough Breaks, a 1993 novel by Mercedes Lackey and Holly Lisle

== Film and television ==
- When the Bough Breaks (1947 film), a British film directed by Lawrence Huntington
- When the Bough Breaks (1986 film), a television adaptation of Jonathan Kellerman's novel, starring Ted Danson
- When the Bough Breaks (1994 film), a thriller by Michael Cohn
- When the Bough Breaks (2016 film), a psychological thriller film by Jon Cassar
- "When the Bough Breaks" (Castle), a 2009 television episode
- "When the Bough Breaks" (Doctors), a 2003 television episode
- "When the Bough Breaks" (Haven), a 2013 television episode
- "When the Bough Breaks" (Star Trek: The Next Generation), a 1988 television episode

== Music ==
- When the Bough Breaks (album), a 1997 album by Bill Ward

== See also ==
- Down Will Come Baby, a 1999 American television film
- When the Wind Blows (disambiguation)
