= Keswick Codlin =

Apple cultivar

'Keswick Codlin'
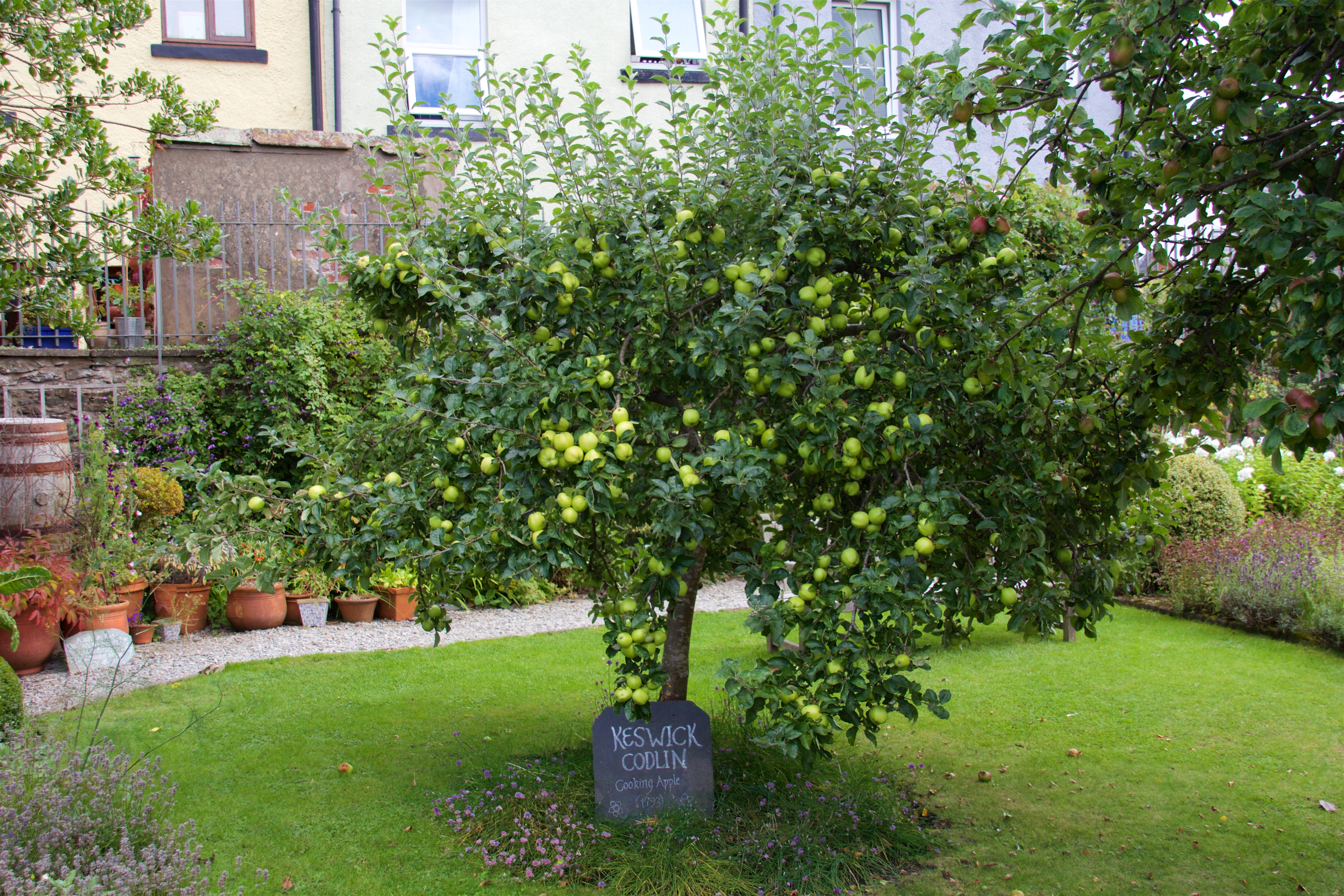
- Genus: Malus
- Species: M. domestica
- Cultivar: 'Keswick Codlin'
- Origin: Lancashire, England, pre 1793

'Keswick Codlin' is an apple cultivar that is considered excellent for cooking, but does not keep well in storage.
