= James T. Peasgood =

American embezzler (1890–1957)

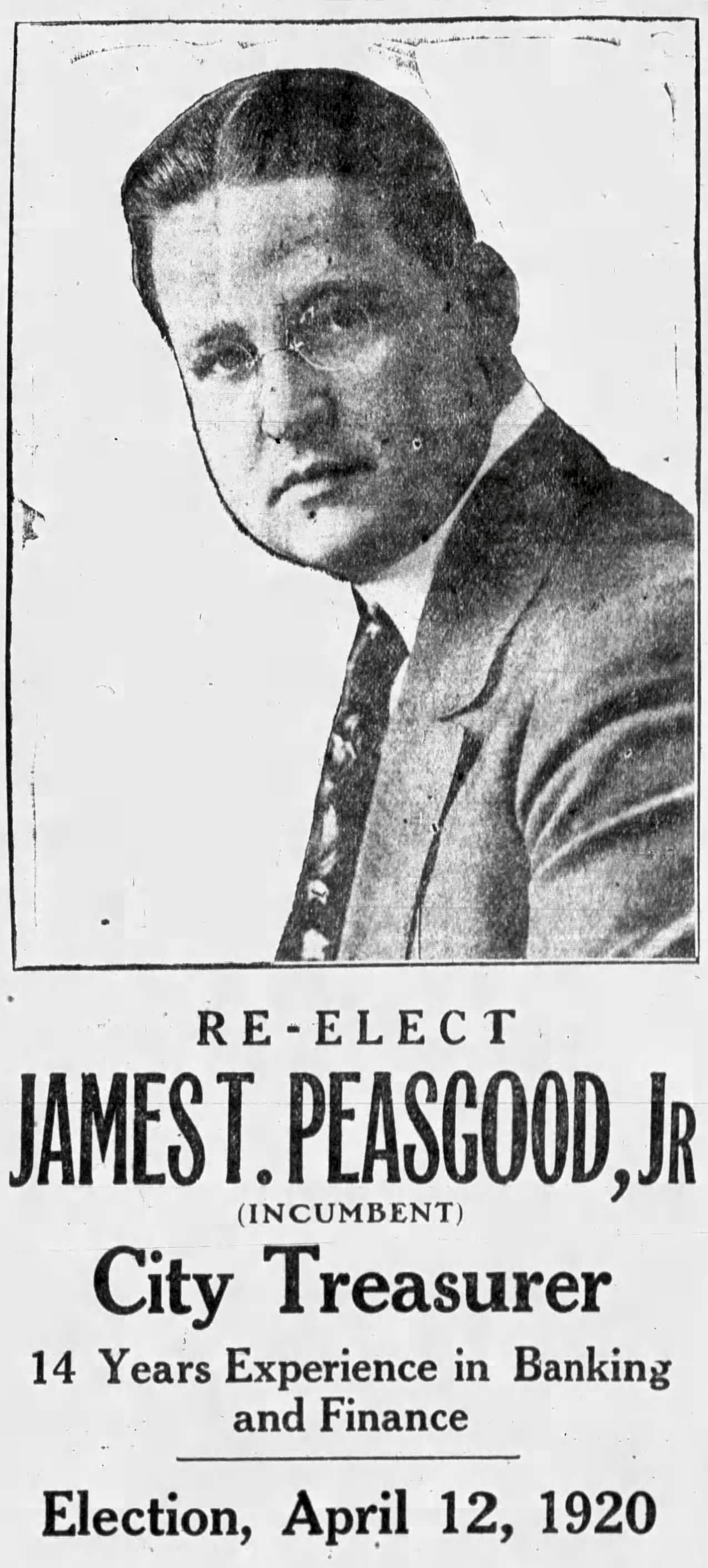
- Born: James Thomas Peasgood Jr. March 8, 1890; Philadelphia, Pennsylvania, U.S.
- Died: July 12, 1957 (aged 67); Salinas, California, U.S.

James T. Peasgood (March 8, 1890 – July 12, 1957) was a municipal treasurer who was convicted in 1922 of embezzling from the city of Venice, California, United States. After serving three and a half years in San Quentin State Prison, Peasgood moved to Salinas, California, where he ran produce-packing companies.

== Biography ==
Peasgood was born in Pennsylvania but had come to California at early days with his father, who became a Santa Monica city councilman and Santa Monica superintendent of buildings. Before taking a position in local government, Peasgood had served as a teller at the First National Bank of Venice. Peasgood had served as Venice city treasurer for seven years before he suddenly vanished in April 1922. According to a history published in 1975, "Peasgood's troubles started in May of 1921 when rumors began to stir around the canal city that Venice was on the verge of bankruptcy. The Los Angeles County Grand Jury began to make inquiries and the Venetian mayor suddenly resigned. Treasurer Peasgood was eventually hauled before the grand jury on five counts of misconduct in office. The charges stemmed from his habit of depositing city funds in certain banks without collecting interest on the monies. The grand jury dismissed the charges and James Peasgood rested a little easier."

However, two days after the city of Venice hired an independent auditor, Peasgood suddenly left for a fishing trip to Oxnard on Saturday, April 29, and did not return for the workweek following, leading the city council to elevate his deputy to the treasurer position. According to the Los Angeles Examiner, Peasgood left a note for his wife that read, "I have been playing a losing game and I cannot stay and face the disgrace. You will never see me again!"

An independent auditor was brought in and discovered $19,000 missing from the city's accounts. Peasgood turned himself in on May 17, 1922, confessing that he had taken the money to pay gambling debts and sustain an extravagant lifestyle. Peasgood had apparently been monkeying with the books since 1918. According to the Venice Vanguard:

His statement revealed that a home, upon which he was called to make substantial monthly payments, furniture for same, a piano and an automobile, all bought on installments together with increased living costs, resulted in fixed monthly expenses which the salary he was paid fell considerably short of meeting. Thus grew, from month to month, a deficit, to meet which Peasgood, desperate and seeking to maintain his credit and standing as a city official, began borrowing now and then from the paving bond fund, held and handled by him in trust. Thus, in turn, was created an accumulated shortage in the paving bond fund and to prevent the discovery of this condition, Peasgood, according to his explanation, transferred moneys from the general fund of the city. These amounts from the general fund, as nearly as Peasgood could remember, tally almost to the cent with the figures arrived at and submitted by Macleod, Macfarlane and Co. in their report to the trustees last Monday evening.

Peasgood was convicted of embezzlement and sentenced to one to 10 years in the state penitentiary. He served approximately three and a half years, from December 15, 1922, to July 15, 1926, in San Quentin prison. The theft shook public confidence in the government of the city of Venice, a shift that contributed to the Venice electorate's decision to accept annexation by the city of Los Angeles in 1925. Peasgood eventually moved to Salinas in Monterey County and worked in the fruit-packing industry. He died in Salinas in 1957.

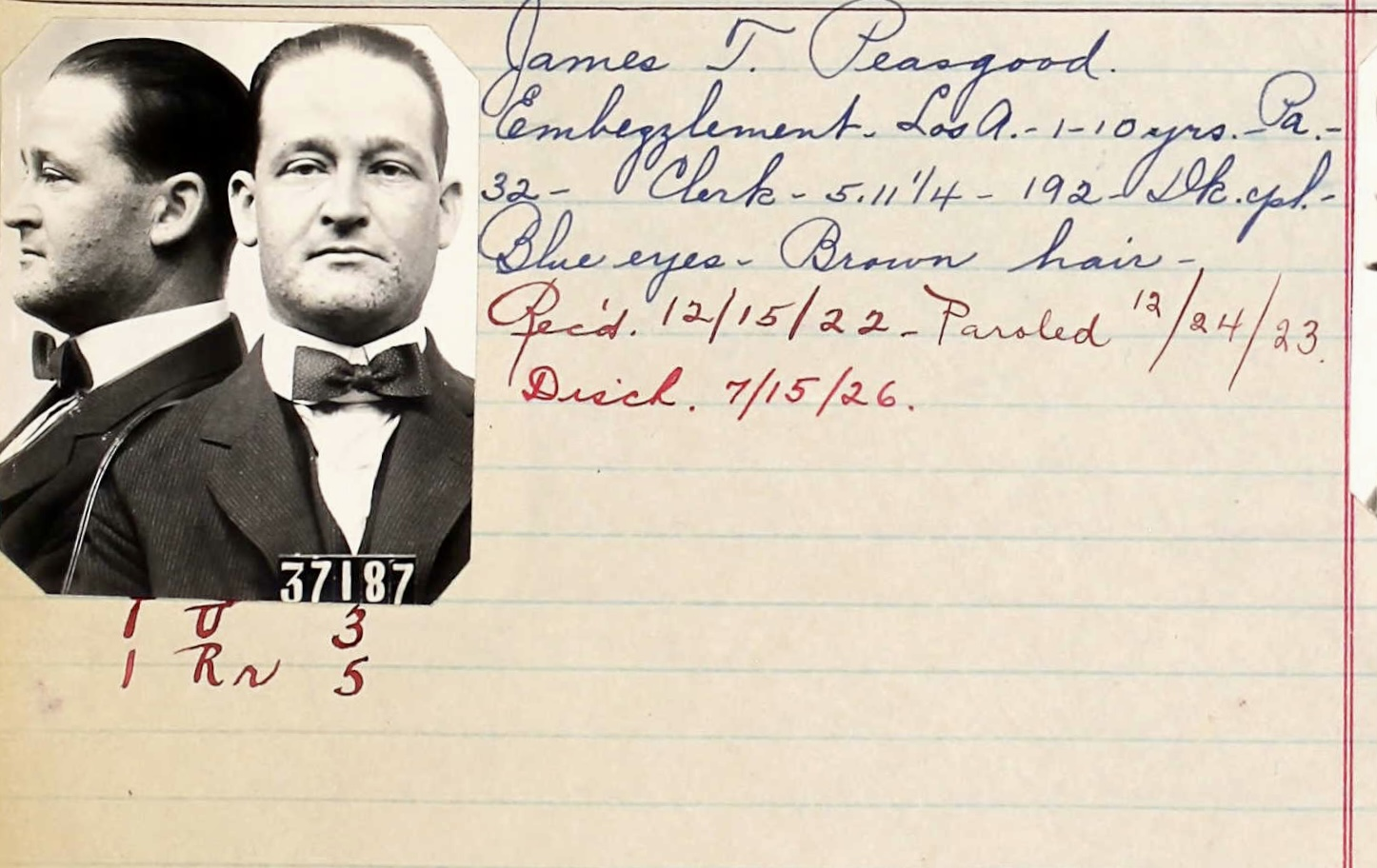
Peasgood at San Quentin
