= Landsberger Reinette =

Apple cultivar

'Landsberger Reinette'
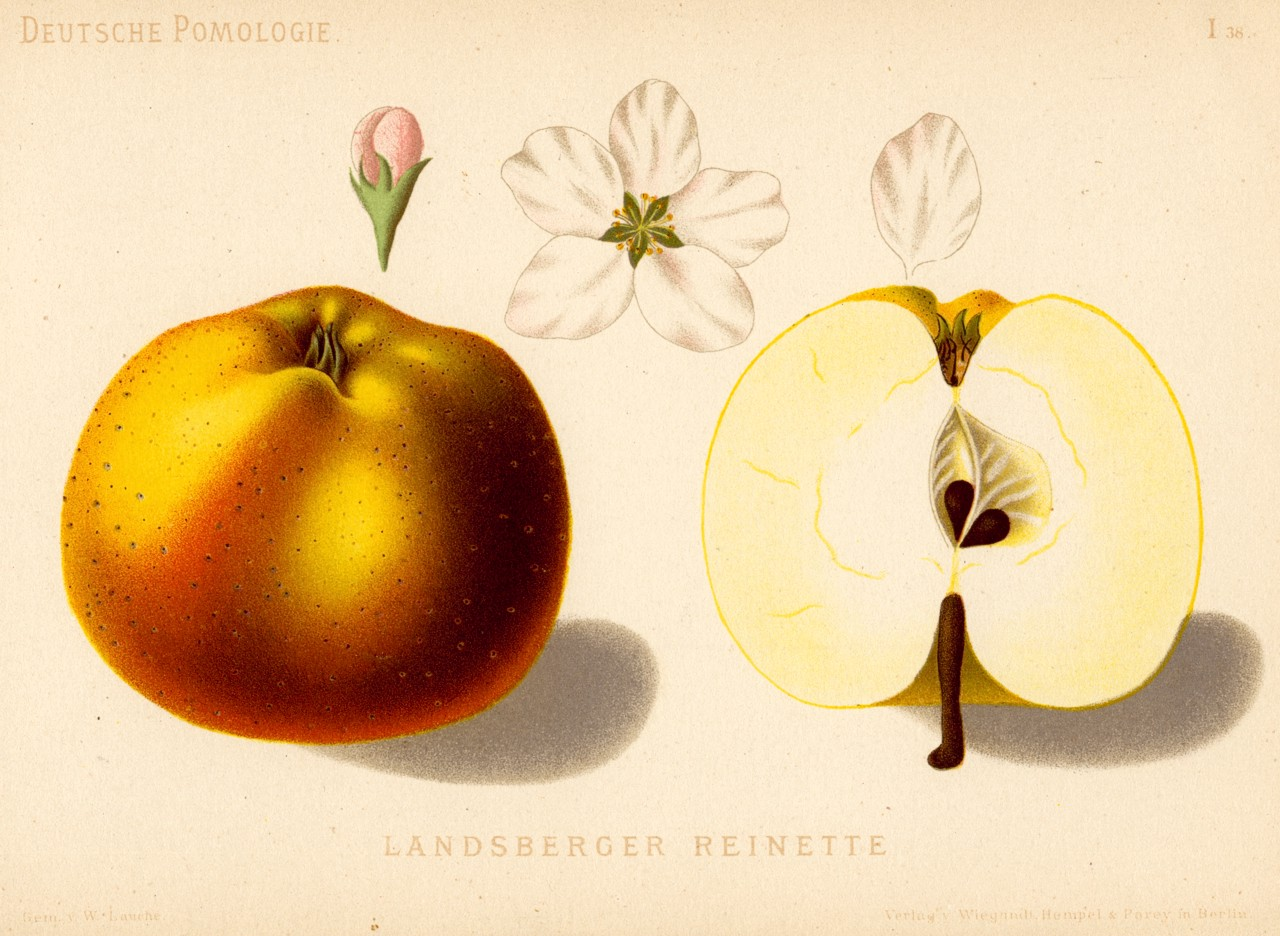
- Cultivar: 'Landsberger Reinette'
- Origin: Kingdom of Prussia, about 1840

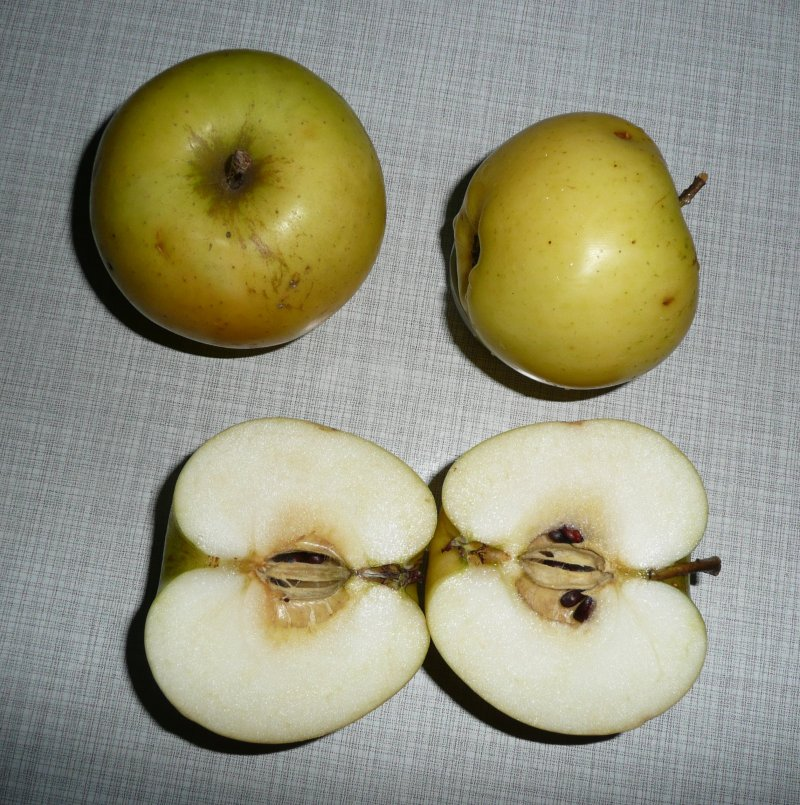

'Landsberger Reinette' is a cultivar of domesticated apple that originated in Landsberg an der Warthe. Synonymes: Surprise and Reneta Gorzowska. It is also ambiguously known as 'Surprise' apple. It is a parent of the 'Minister von Hammerstein' apple, which is in turn a parent of 'Geheimrat Doktor Oldenburg'.
