= Sandow (apple) =

Apple cultivar

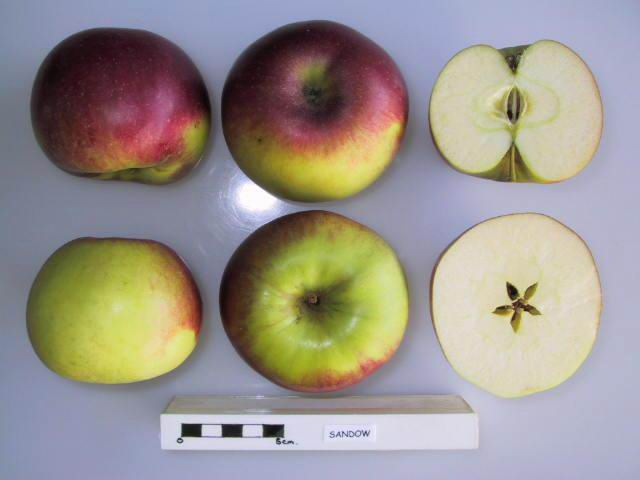
Sandow apple with cross-section

The Sandow is an apple cultivar that is an "open-pollinated seedling of Northern Spy" that was created in 1912. It has been described as an apple that is suitable for eating, (as opposed to being a cooking apple). It has a crisp flesh that is juicy and sweet, with "bright scarlet stripes over red flush". It typically ripens in mid-October, and bears fruit sooner relative to other apple cultivars. It tends to flourish best in zones 3-5 in the United States.

== See also ==
- List of apple cultivars
