= Bloody Ploughman =

Apple cultivar

Malus domestica 'Bloody Ploughman'
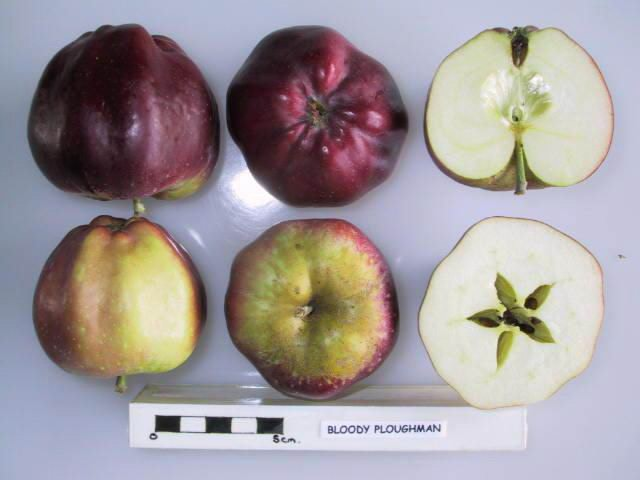
- Bloody Ploughman apples
- Species: Malus domestica
- Cultivar: 'Bloody Ploughman'
- Origin: , Carse of Gowrie, Scotland, 1883

The Bloody Ploughman is a domesticated apple cultivar. The cultivar originated in Scotland.

== Characteristics ==
- The cavity is deep, narrow, is mostly lined with russet which can spread out over the shoulder.
- The stalk is sturdy.
- The basin varies, but is ribbed and irregular.
- The eye is open or partly open.
- The sepals are broad and reflexed.
- The flesh is pink when ripe, sweet, juicy and crisp.
- The tube is broad cone, the stamens are basal and the core is situated away from the axis.
- The tree is vigorous.
- The season is September to November.
- The flowering is just before Cox's Orange Pippin. Pollination Group D.
  1. On May 8, it is 10% flowering.
  2. On May 12, it is full (80%) flowering.
  3. On May 19, it has 90% petal fall.
- Picking time: mid-September.

== Name ==
The story is that a gamekeeper shot dead a ploughman caught stealing apples from the Megginch Estate. When his body was returned to his wife, she found stolen apples in his pockets and threw them onto a rubbish heap. One of the resulting seedlings bore apples of a deep, blood red. This tree gave rise to the cultivar that was named after the unfortunate ploughman.

== External links and references ==
- "Bloody Ploughman Apple - Arca del Gusto". Slow Food Foundation.
- A photo of the inside of a Bloody Ploughman
- "Traditional Scottish apples to make a comeback". Daily Telegraph. 2009-08-23. ISSN 0307-1235.
