= Grenadier (apple) =

Apple cultivar

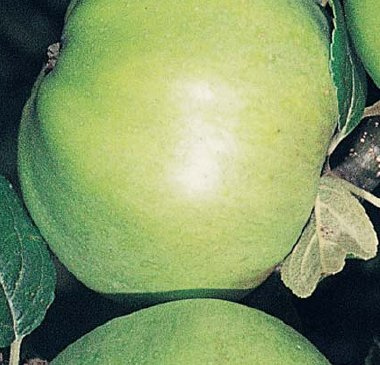

Grenadier is an English cultivar of domesticated apple mainly used for cooking. It originated in the mid-19th century in Buckinghamshire. It was first recorded in 1862 in Maidstone, Kent, exhibited by Charles Turner of Slough, Berkshire, and then commercially introduced by Bunyard Nursery.

It is generally easy to grow and reliably bears heavy crops. It tolerates wet conditions and resists disease and frost damage to blooms. First Class Certificate from Royal Horticultural Society in 1883. It earned the Award of Garden Merit by the Royal Horticultural Society in 1993.

The fruit has smooth, pale green skin, changing to yellowish green when ready to pick, and is lumped and sometimes widely ribbed, with no apple russet. The flesh is off-white, sometimes tinged with green, with a sharp taste. It melts in cooking resulting in a good yellowish puree, used as an apple jam or for apple sauce; it is not recommended for pies. It ripens in early mid-season (mid-August in the United Kingdom) and keeps fresh for about one week. It is self-sterile and a good pollinator for other apples.
