= Chelmsford Wonder =

Apple cultivar

Malus domestica 'Chelmsford Wonder'
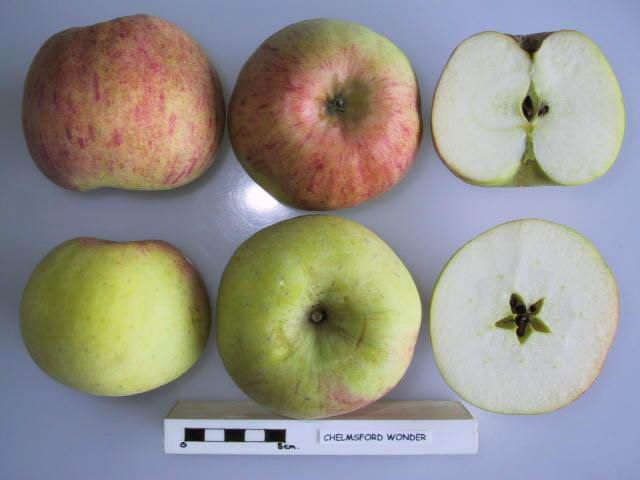
- Cultivar: 'Chelmsford Wonder'
- Origin: about 1870

Chelmsford Wonder is a cooking apple cultivar.

Raised at Chelmsford about 1870 and introduced by local nurseryman William Saltmarsh in 1892. A large long keeping yellow-skinned apple with diffuse orange pink flush. The Chelmsford Wonder received an Award of Merit and a First Class Certificate from the Royal Horticultural Society in 1891. Still grown in Essex orchards.

It is also grown at Brogdale National Fruit Collection in Kent.
