= Autumn Bough =

Apple cultivar

'Autumn Bough'
- Species: Malus domestica

'Autumn Bough' is an early ripening cultivar of domesticated apple also known by various other names including 'Montgomery Sweet', 'Philadelphia Sweet', 'Sweet Bellflower', 'Sweet Harvest', and 'White Sugar'.
