= Peasgood's Nonsuch =

Apple cultivar

'Peasgood's Nonsuch'
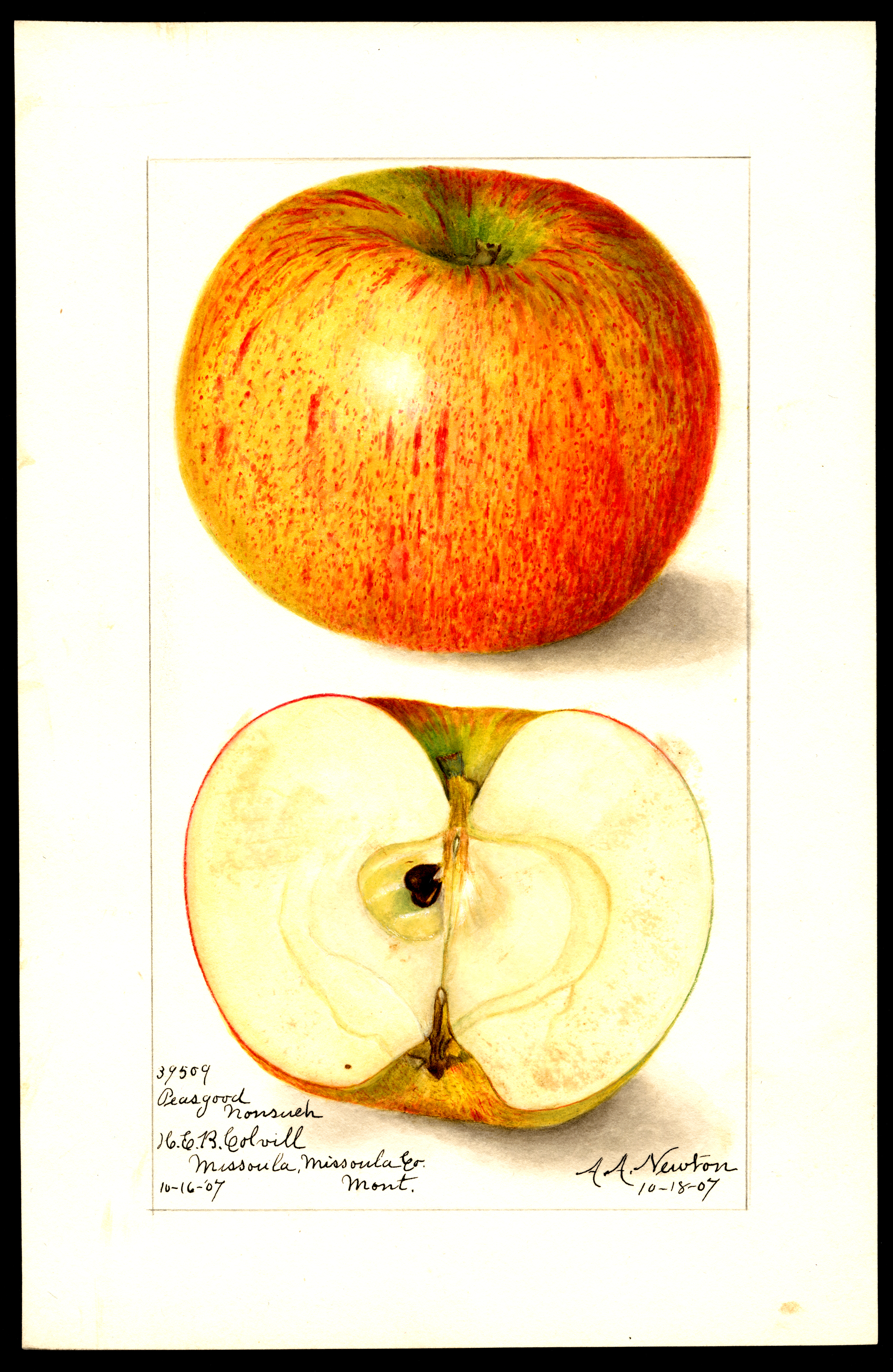
- Genus: Malus
- Species: M. domestica
- Cultivar: 'Peasgood's Nonsuch'
- Origin: Raised by Mrs Peasgood, Lincolnshire, England from seed sown in about 1858

'Peasgood's Nonsuch' is an apple cultivar used both for eating fresh and for cooking. One of the parents is Alexander. Several other apple cultivars( Iedzenu, Reverend W. Wilks, S.T. Wright, Shoesmith, Victory, Alastair Cannon Whithe, John Waterer) are descended from it. Sugar 13.5%, acid 15.5g/litre, vitamin C 21 mg/100g.
