= White Transparent =

Apple cultivar

'White Transparent'
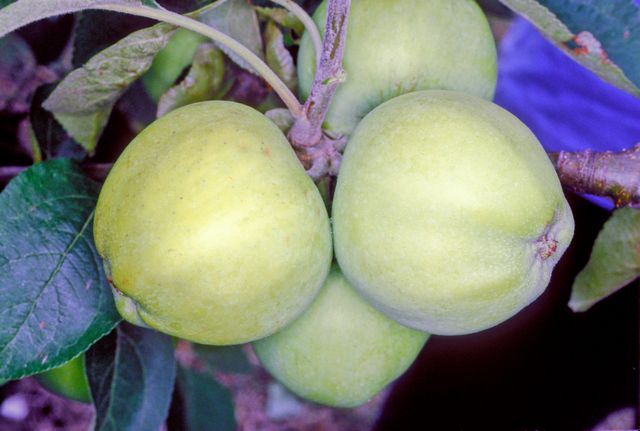
- White transparent apples.
- Genus: Malus domestica
- Hybrid parentage: Unknown
- Cultivar: 'White Transparent'
- Origin: Latvia, 1850

White Transparent is an early-season cultivar of apple which is usually used for cooking due to its sharp taste. It is sometimes said to be the same as 'Yellow Transparent', but 'Yellow Transparent' is sometimes described differently, with fine rather than coarse flesh, and a sub-acid rather than acid flavour. Weight 75 g,

- S-genotype S1 S?
- Density 0.75-0.77 g/cc,
- Sugar 10.5%,
- Acid 11 g/litre,
- Vitamin C 15 mg/100g.

== History ==
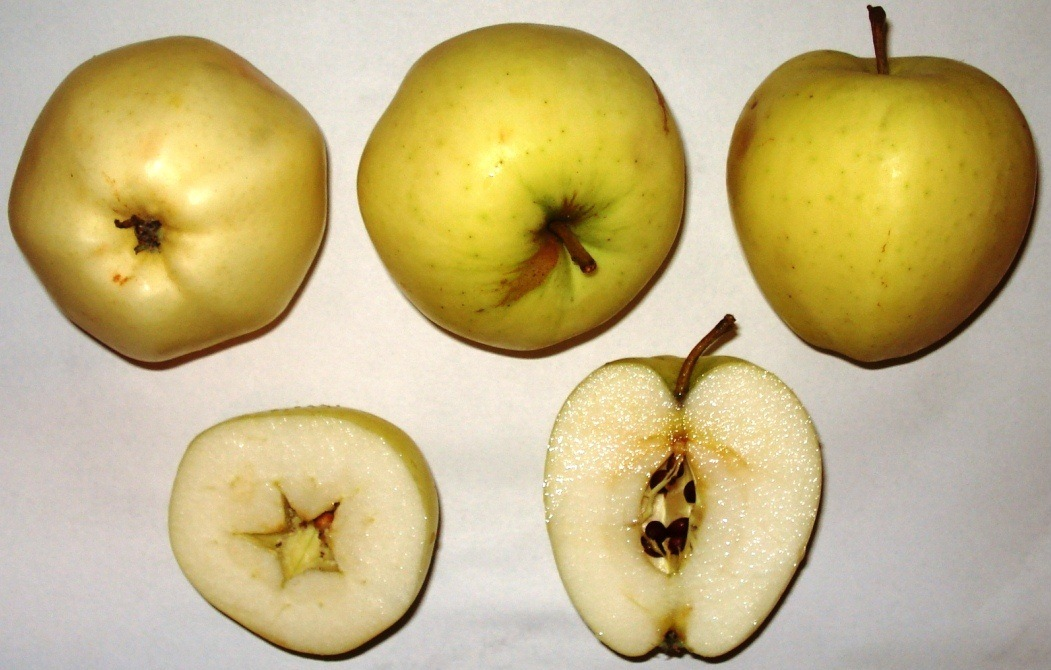
Yellow transparent apples.

White Transparent is a chance seedling which was found in the Wagner nursery in Riga around 1850. The cultivar was widely grown during the 19th century in Europe. It was introduced to France in 1852. It was introduced to North America in 1870 where it was grown commercially as an early dual purpose variety and picked up the name 'Yellow Transparent'. The specimen is still widely grown in Poland, Russia and Sweden where it is sometimes referred to as the Baltic Sea apple. The cultivar was significant because it was an early-season apple in most places. Because of its harsh flavour and hard texture, the apples were often baked in ashes.

== Description ==
The tree is very hardy and the fruit has a good resistance to scabs, but is at risk of developing canker caused by the Nectria fungus and fireblight. The tree is known to be a good and regular cropper of a medium-sized fruit, which has a very pale green skin which turns to pale yellow with ripening. It is usually harvested while still greenish, since it tends to deteriorate fast while yellow.

It is named "transparent" because it is almost luminescent in colour and has a white flesh, that is very juicy and has a sharp, refreshing taste.

== Cooking ==
The fruit is good for cooking into a cream colored puree and is usually harvested for this purpose.

== See also ==
- Papirovka, an Eastern European apple cultivar that some sources consider to be the same as the White Transparent
