= Maiden Blush apple =

Apple cultivar

Maiden Blush
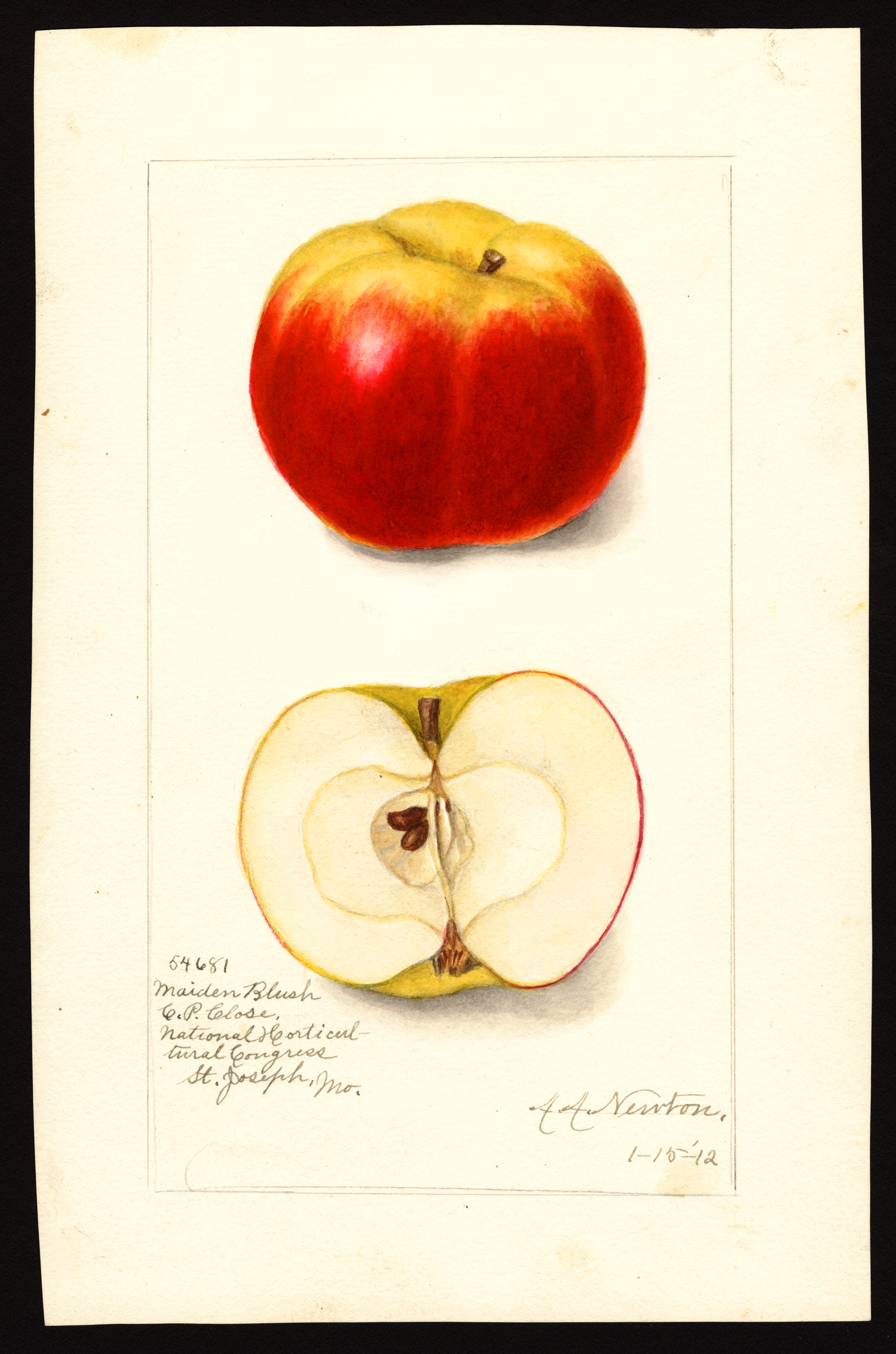
- Genus: Malus
- Species: M. domestica
- Cultivar: Maiden Blush
- Origin: New Jersey, pre 1817

Maiden Blush or Maiden's Blush, also called Lady Blush and Red Cheek, is an apple cultivar used for both fresh eating and for cooking. It was previously a popular apple for drying, for which it is especially well suited due to its low juice content.

Maiden Blush
| ---- | When to pick | When ripe enough to eat | Latest cold storage limit |
|---|---|---|---|
| In Northern states | Aug. 20 - Sept. 10 | Sept. 5 - Oct. 15 | Dec. 15 |
| In Southern states | Aug. 10 - Sept. 1 | Aug. 25 - Sept. 15 | Nov. 1 |
