= List of apple cultivars =

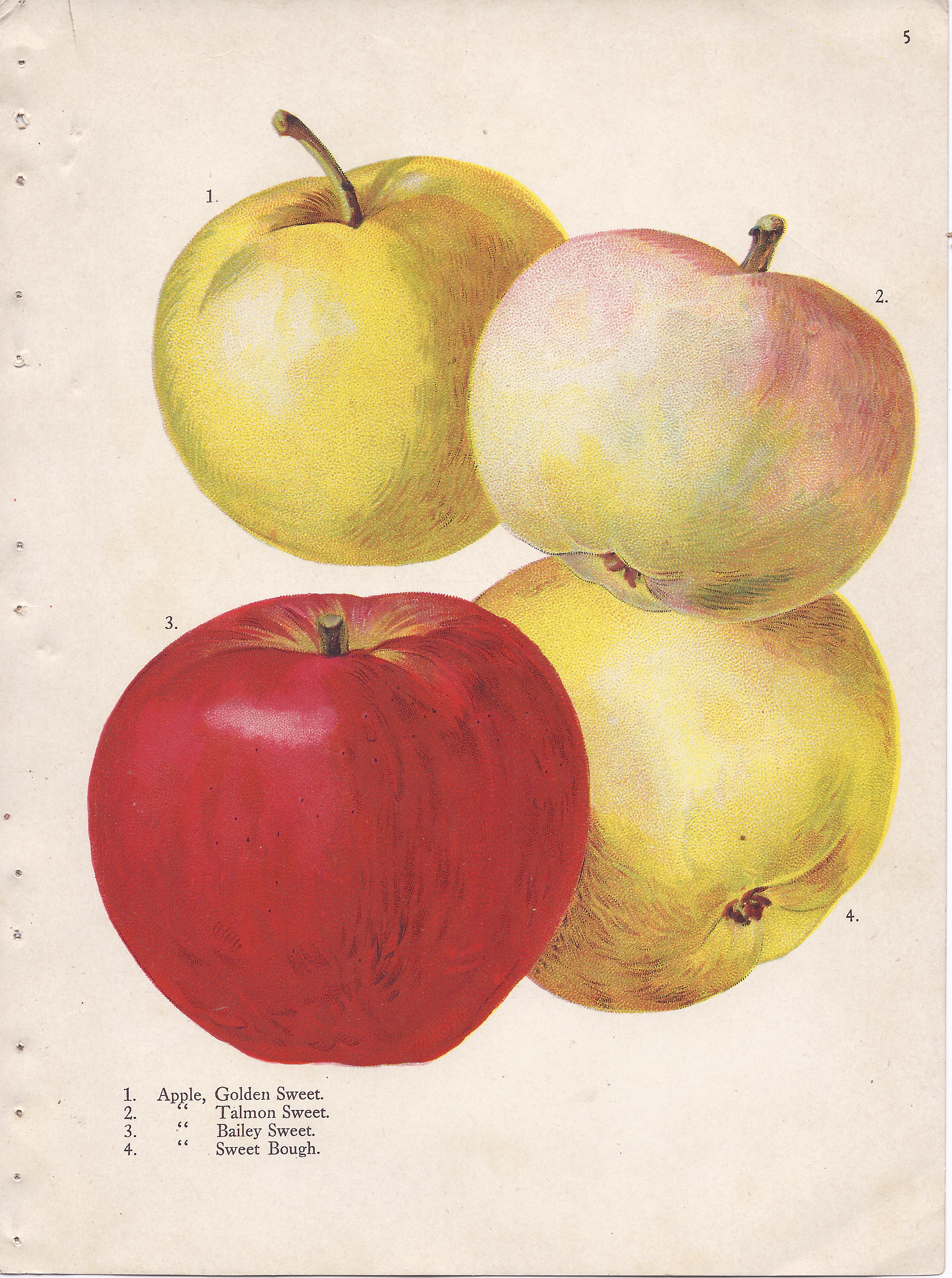
1909 illustrations by Alois Lunzer depicting apple cultivars Golden Sweet, Talmon Sweet, Bailey Sweet and Sweet Bough

Over 7,500 cultivars of the culinary or eating apple (Malus domestica) are known. Some are extremely important economically as commercial products, though the vast majority are not suitable for mass production. In the following list, use for "eating" means that the fruit is consumed raw, rather than cooked. Cultivars used primarily for making cider are indicated. Those varieties marked agm have gained the Royal Horticultural Society's Award of Garden Merit.

This list doesn't include the species and varieties of apples collectively known as crab apples, which are grown primarily for ornamental purposes, though they may be used to make jelly or compote. These are described under Malus.

== Table of apples ==
=== Abbreviations ===
| Abbreviations | Full form | Abbreviations | Full form |
|---|---|---|---|
| AC | Apple canker | AM | Award of Merit |
| AS | Apple scab | AGM | RHS Award of Garden Merit |
| C, VitC | Vitamin C mg/100g | BB | Biennial bearing |
| FCC | First Class Certificat | DBH | Days from full bloom to harvest |
| PW | Powdery mildew | P | Parentage |
| RHS | Royal Horticultural Society | r | Resistant |
| PickGPickg | Harvest time in Germany | Pick45 | Harvest time at places with a mean annual temperature of 45 °F (7 °C) |
| PickE Picke | Harvest time in south England | Pick50 | Harvest time at places with a mean annual temperature of 50 °F (10 °C) |
| s | Susceptible | Pick55 | Harvest time at places with a mean annual temperature of 55 °F (13 °C) |
| TA | Titratable acidity % | SS | Soluble solids % |
| TRI | Triploid | | |
Languages
| cs. | Czech (Čeština) | da. | Danish (Dansk) |
| de. | German (Deutsch) | fr. | French (Français) |
| hu. | Hungarian (Magyar) | nl. | Dutch (Nederland) |
| no. | Norwegian (Norsk) | pl. | Polish (Polski) |
| ru. | Russian (Русский; Russky) | sv. | Swedish (Svenska) |

== Cider apples ==
Cider apples are a variety of apples that may be far too sour or bitter for fresh eating, but are used for making cider. Varieties in italics are used for both cider and eating purposes.

List of abbreviations used in the following table
| Abbreviations | Full form | Abbreviations | Full form |
|---|---|---|---|
| s | Susceptible | r | Resistant |
| AS | Apple scab (resistant/susceptible to) | AC | Apple canker (resistant/susceptible to) |
| BI | Bacterial infections (resistant/susceptible to) | PM | Powdery mildew (resistant/susceptible to) |
| TRI | Triploid | | |

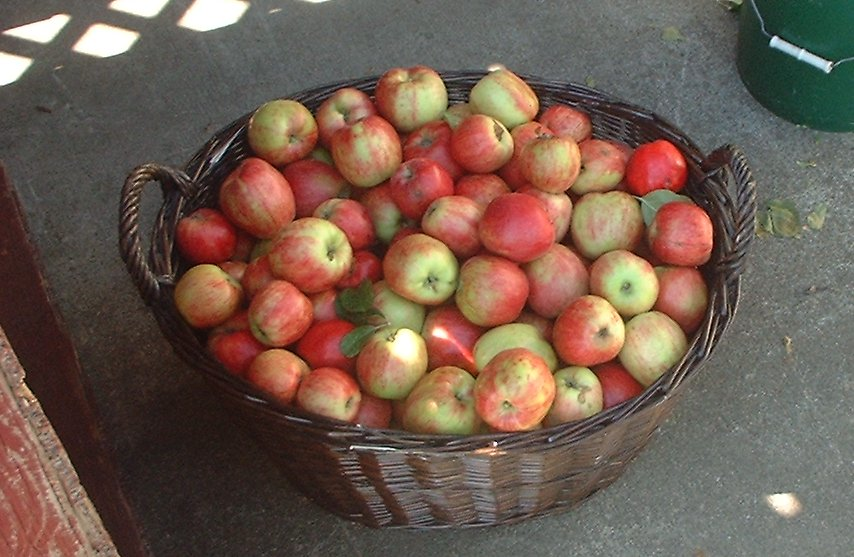
Gravenstein apples, used for cooking, dessert, and cider

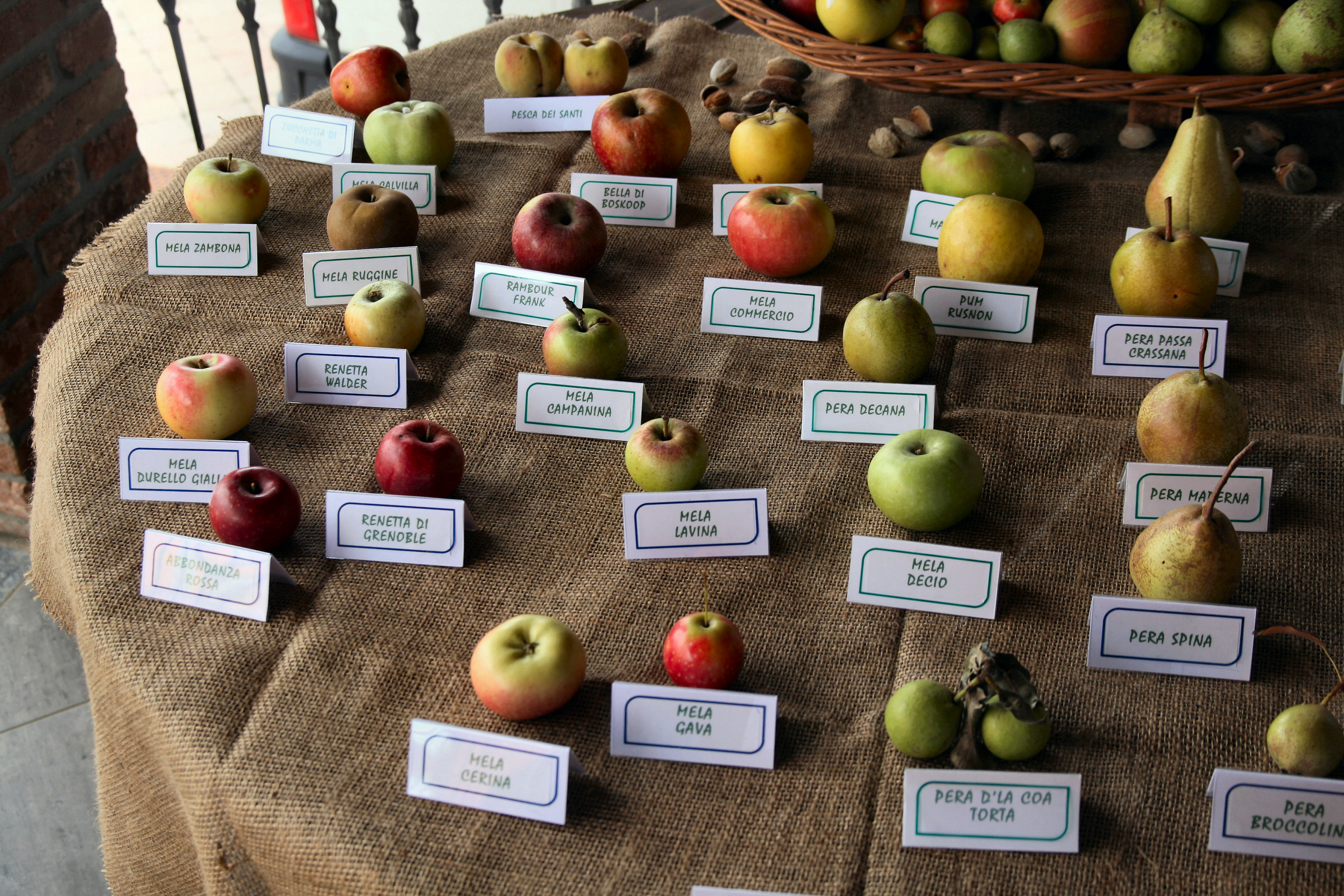
Less common apple cultivars (among pear cultivars)

A range of modern apple cultivars

| Common name | Origin | First developed | Type | Juice titratable acidity % weight/volume | Juice specific gravity or ^{o}Brix grams/liter | Tannin % | Days from full bloom to maturity | Disease susceptibility |
|---|---|---|---|---|---|---|---|---|
| Amanda | Somerset, England | 2007 | Bittersweet | 0.22 | 1054 (Somerset, England) | 0.23 | 137 (Somerset, England) | |
| Amere de Berthcourt | France | | Bittersweet | 0.20 | 1049 (Washington, US) | 0.34 | 145 (Washington, US) | |
| Amere Forestier | France | | Sweet | 0.20 | 1046 (Washington, US) | 0.34 | 153 (Washington, US) | |
| Angela | Somerset, England | 2007 | Bittersharp | 0.62 | 1049 (Somerset, England) | 0.19 | 135 (Somerset, England) | |
| Antoinette | France | | Bittersweet | 0.25 | 1050 (France) | 0.27 | | sAS |
| Arbeya | Spain | | Sharp | 0.57 | | 0.16 | | |
| Arbeya Montés | Spain | | Sharp | 0.71 | | 0.15 | | |
| Armagnac | France | | Sharp | 0.81 | 1065 (France) | 0.17 | | |
| Ashmead's Kernel | Gloucestershire, England | c. 1700 | | | | | 134 (Ontario, Canada) | |
| Ashton Bitter | Somerset, England | 1947 | Bittersweet | | | | | |
| Ashton Brown Jersey | Somerset, England | 1903 | Bittersweet | 0.14 | 1054 (Somerset, England) | 0.34 | 194 (Somerset, England) | |
| Avrolles | France | | Sharp | 1.20 | 1055 (France) | 0.09 | | |
| Backwell red | Somerset England | Old | Sharp | 0.70 | 1051 (Somerset, England) | 0.13 | 172 (Somerset, England) | |
| Baldwin | Wilmington, Massachusetts, US | c. 1740 | Sharp | 0.74 | 15.3 | 0.059 | | |
| Ball's Bittersweet | Herefordshire, England | 1927 | Bittersweet | 0.28 | | 0.28 | | |
| Bedan | France | | Bittersweet | 0.15 | 1056 (Somerset, England), 1051 (Washington, US) | 0.23 | 184 (Somerset, England) 136 (Washington, US) | sAS |
| Belle de Boskoop | Netherlands | 1856 | Bittersharp | 1 | | | | |
| Belle Fille de la Manche | France | | Sweet | | | | | sAS, TRI |
| Betty | Somerset, England | 2007 | Sharp | 0.90 | 1050 (Somerset, England) | 0.11 | 125 (Somerset, England) | |
| Bickington Grey | Devonshire | | Sharp | | | | | |
| Binet Blanc | France | | Bittersweet | 0.18 | 1060 (France) | 0.25 | | |
| Binet Rouge | France | | Bittersweet | 0.18 | 1063 (France) | 0.24 | | sPM |
| Binet Violet | France | | Bittersweet | 0.17 | 1050 (France) | 0.26 | | |
| Bisquet | France | | Bittersweet | 0.21 | 1045 (France) | 0.21 | | |
| Bittenfelder | Germany | 1930s | Bittersharp | 1.00 | 1070 (Germany) | | | |
| Black Crofton | Australia | | Sweet | 0.40 | 10.8 | 0.037 | | |
| Black Dabinett | Somerset, England | | Bittersweet | | | | | |
| Black Vallis | Somerset, England | | TRI | | | | | |
| Blanchet | France | | Sharp | 0.48 | 1050 (France) | 0.13 | | |
| Blanc Mollet | France | | Bittersweet | 0.15 | 1046 (Washington, US) | 0.20 | 114 (Washington, US) | |
| Blanc Sur | France | | Sharp | 0.67 | 1055 (France) | 0.12 | | |
| Blanquina | Spain | | Sharp | 0.63 | | 0.09 | | |
| Bohnapfel | Germany | <1800 | Bittersharp | 0.55 | 1050 (Germany) | | | |
| Bran Rose | Herefordshire | <1880 | Sharp | | | | | |
| Bouteville | France | | Sweet | 0.16 | 1052 (Washington, US) | 0.14 | 126 (Washington, US) | |
| Bramley | Nottinghamshire, England | 1809 | Sharp | 0.94 | 1050 (Somerset, England) | 0.12 | 121 (Ontario, Canada) | |
| Bramtot | England | | Bittersweet | 0.32 | 1057 (Washington, US) | 0.50 | 128 (Washington, US) | |
| Breakwell's Seedling | Wales | 1890 | Bittersharp | 0.64 | 1042 (Somerset, England), 1041 (Washington, US) | 0.23 | 150 (Somerset, England), 113 (Ontario, Canada), 110 (Washington, US) | |
| Broad-Leaved Hereford | England | | Bittersweet | | | | | |
| Browns Apple | Devon | 1920s | Sharp | 0.67 | | | 191 (Somerset, England), 92 (Ontario, Canada) | |
| Brown Snout | Herefordshire, England | c. 1850 | Bittersweet | 0.24 | 1053 (Somerset, England), 1051 (Washington, US) | 0.24 | 176 (Somerset, England), 145 (Ontario, Canada), 149 (Washington, US) | |
| Brown Thorn (a.k.a. Argile Grise) | | | Bittersweet | 0.20 | 1048 (Washington, US) | 0.16 | 142 (Washington, US) | |
| Broxwood Foxwhelp | England | 1920 | Bittersharp | 1.91 | | 0.22 | | |
| Bulmer's Norman | France | <1890 | Bittersweet TRI | 0.24 | 1053 (Somerset, England), 1046 (Washington, US) | 0.27 | 165 (Somerset, England), 97 (Ontario, Canada), 127 (Washington, US) | |
| Burrowhill Early | Somerset, England | | Bittersweet | | | | | |
| Buttery d'Or | Dorset, England | | Sharp | | | | | |
| Börtlinger Weinapfel | Germany | 1827 | Bittersharp | | | | | |
| Cadbury (a.k.a. Royal Wildling) | Somerset, England | | Sweet | | | | | |
| Calabaza | Spain | | Sharp | 0.77 | | 0.14 | | |
| Campfield | New Jersey, US | <1817 | Sweet | 0.23 | 1055 (Washington, US) | 0.17 | 172 (Washington, US) | |
| Campillo | Spain | | Sharp | 0.52 | | 0.11 | | |
| Cap of Liberty | Somerset, England | | Bittersharp | 0.82 | 1052 (Somerset, England), 1047 (Washington, US) | 0.21 | 155 (Washington, US) | |
| Captain Broad | Cornwall, England | | Bittersweet TRI | | | | | |
| Cartigny | France | | Bittersweet | 0.21 | 1051 (France) | 0.22 | | |
| Casado | Spain | | Sharp | 0.98 | | 0.19 | | |
| Cazo Jaune | France | | Bittersharp | 1.31 | 1054 (France) | 0.33 | | |
| Chaperonnais | France | | Bittersweet | | | | | |
| Charlepitré | France | | Sweet | | | | | |
| Cherry Norman | Herefordshire | <1880 | Bittersweet | | | | | |
| Cherry Pearmain | Herefordshire | | Sharp | | | | | |
| Chestnut | Minnesota, US | 1946 | Bittersharp | 0.51 | 14.9 | | | |
| Chevalier Jaune | France | | Bittersweet | 0.22 | 1053 (France) | 0.38 | | |
| Chisel Jersey (a.k.a. Bitter Jersey) | Somerset, England | <1900 | Bittersweet | 0.22 | 1059 (Somerset, England), 1056 (Washington, US) | 0.40 | 194 (Somerset, England), 163 (Washington, US) | |
| C'Huero Briz | France | | Bittersweet | 0.21 | 1056 (France) | 0.47 | | |
| Cider Ladies Finger | Somerset, England | | Sharp | 0.59 | 1052 (Somerset, England) | | | |
| Cidor | France | | Bittersweet | 0.17 | 1055 (France) | 0.40 | | sAS |
| Cimitiere | France | | Bittersweet | 0.13 | 1039 (Washington, US) | 0.23 | 133 (Washington, US) | |
| Clara | Spain | | Sweet | 0.21 | | 0.19 | | |
| Clos Renaux | France | | Bittersweet | 0.25 | 1052 (France) | 0.22 | | |
| Clozette Douce | France | | Bittersweet | 0.22 | 1054 (France) | 0.23 | | |
| Coat Jersey | Somerset, England | | Bittersweet | | | | | |
| Coleman's Seedling | Devonshire | | Sharp | | | | | |
| Collaos | Spain | | Sharp | 0.62 | | 0.11 | | |
| Collington Big Bitters | | | Bittersweet TRI | 0.21 | | 0.21 | | |
| Coloradona | Spain | | Sweet | 0.15 | | 0.13 | | |
| Corset Hill | Gloucestershire, England | | Sharp | | | | | |
| Court Pendu Plat | France | 1613 | Sharp | 0.81 | 1048 (Washington, US) | 0.11 | 145 (Washington, US) | |
| Court Royal (a.k.a. Sweet Blenheim) | England | | Sweet TRI | 0.21 | 1050 (Somerset, England) | 0.11 | 195 (Somerset, England) | |
| Cox Orange Pippin | England | 1829 | | | | | 121 (Ontario, Canada) | |
| Crimson Crisp | New Jersey, US | 1971 | | | | | 138 (Ontario, Canada) | |
| Crimson King | Somerset, England | <1900 | Sharp TRI | 0.6 | 1044 (Somerset, England) | 0.13 | 195 (Somerset, England) | |
| Cristalina | Spain | | Sharp | 0.46 | | 0.066 | | |
| Crow Egg | Massachusetts, US | 1832 | Sweet | 0.31 | 11.4 | 0.044 | | |
| Cul Plat | France | | Bittersweet | | | | | |
| Cummy Norman | Radnorshire, Wales | <1876 | Bittersweet | | | | | |
| Dabinett | Somerset, England | Late 19th century | Bittersweet | 0.18 | 1057 (Somerset, England), 1055 (Washington, US) | 0.29 | 180 (Somerset, England), 131 (Ontario, Canada), 148 (Washington, US) | |
| Debbie | Somerset, England | 2007 | Sharp | 0.9 | 1050 (Somerset, England) | 0.08 | 110 (Somerset, England) | |
| De La Riega | Spain | | Sharp | 0.58 | | 0.11 | | |
| Democrat | | | Sweet | 0.37 | 10.6 | 0.044 | | |
| Diot Roux | France | | Sharp | 0.98 | 1052 (France) | 0.18 | | |
| Dolores | Spain | | Sharp | 0.54 | | 0.07 | | |
| Domaines | France | | Bittersweet | 0.21 | 1067 (France), 1050 (Washington, US) | 0.26 | 153 (Washington, US) | |
| Douce Coetligné | France | | Sweet | 0.19 | 1051 (France) | 0.18 | | sPM, sBI |
| Douce Moen | France | | Bittersweet | 0.21 | 1061 (France) | 0.24 | | sAS, sPM, sAC, sBI |
| Doux au Gober | France | | Sweet | | | | | |
| Doux Eveque Jaune | France | | Sweet | 0.16 | 1052 (France) | 0.20 | | |
| Doux Joseph | France | | Bittersweet | 0.21 | 1058 (France) | 0.36 | | |
| Doux Lozon | France | | Bittersweet | 0.14 | 1053 (France) | 0.21 | | |
| Doux Normandie | France | | Sweet | 0.16 | 1065 (France), 1047 (Washington, US) | 0.14 | 147 (Washington, US) | |
| Doux Veret de Carrouges | France | | Sweet | | | | | |
| Dove | Somerset, England | <1899 | Bittersweet | 0.22 | 1049 (Somerset, England) | 0.31 | 168 (Somerset, England) | |
| Dufflin | Devonshire | | Sweet | | | | | |
| Dunkerton's Late Sweet | Somerset, England | | Sweet | | | | | |
| Durón Arroes | Spain | | Sharp | 0.52 | | 0.12 | | |
| Durón Encarnado | Spain | | Sharp | 0.75 | | 0.10 | | |
| Durona Tresali | Spain | | Sharp | 0.77 | | 0.14 | | |
| Dymock Red | Gloucestershire, England | <1800 | Bittersharp | | 1052 (Somerset, England) | 0.22 | 149 (Somerset, England) | |
| Early Bird | | | Bittersweet | 0.21 | 1052 | 0.55 | | |
| Eggleton Styre | Herefordshire, England | 1847 | Sweet | | | | | |
| Ellis Bitter | Newton St. Cyres, Devon, England | c. 1850 | Bittersweet | 0.20 | 1053 (Somerset, England) | 0.24 | 157 (Somerset, England) | |
| Engelsberger | Germany | | | | | | | |
| Fair Maid of Taunton (a.k.a. Moonshines) | Somerset | | Sharp | | | | | |
| Enterprise | Illinois, US | 1993 | Sharp | 0.63 | | | 172 (Ontario, Canada) | |
| Esopus Spitzenberg | New York, US | c. 1750 | | | | | 154 (Ontario, Canada) | |
| Filbarrel | Somerset, England | | Bittersweet | 0.22 | 1045 (Washington, US) | 0.19 | 180 (Somerset, England), 160 (Washington, US) | |
| Finkenwerder Herbstprinz | Germany | 1860 | Sharp | 0.98 | 1055 (Washington, US) | 0.07 | 127 (Washington, US) | |
| Fiona | Somerset, England | 2007 | Sharp | 0.69 | 1049 (Somerset, England) | 0.15 | 125 (Somerset, England) | |
| Four Square | England | | Sharp TRI | | | | | |
| Foxwhelp | Gloucestershire, England | <1650 | Sharp | 0.69 | 1048 (Washington, US) | 0.17 | 152 (Washington, US) | |
| Frederick | Monmouthshire, Wales | 1800s | Sharp | 1.02 | 1048 (Somerset, England) | 0.09 | 190 (Somerset, England) | |
| Fréquin Audievre | | | | | | | 168 (Somerset, England) | |
| Fréquin Rouge | France | | Bittersweet | 0.24 | 1065 (France), 1047 (Washington, US) | 0.51 | 148 (Ontario, Canada), 148 (Washington, US) | sAS, sAC |
| Fresnosa | Spain | | Sharp | 0.67 | | 0.11 | | |
| Fuentes | Spain | | Sharp | 0.75 | | 0.11 | | |
| Gehrers Rambour | Germany | 1885 | Bittersharp | | | | | |
| Gennet Moyele | England | 1600s | Bittersharp | >1.2 | 1052 (Somerset, England) | | | |
| Gesnot | France | | Sharp | 0.65 | 1049 | 0.11 | | |
| Gilly | Somerset, England | 2007 | Bittersharp | 0.54 | 1053 (Somerset, England) | 0.18 | 125 (Somerset, England) | |
| Golden Ball | Devonshire | | Sharp | | | | | |
| Golden Russet | New York, US | <1850 | Sharp | 0.66 | 1061 (Washington, US) | 0.10 | 161 (Ontario, Canada), 167 (Washington, US) | |
| Golden Spire | England | 1850 | | | | | | |
| GoldRush | Indiana, US | 1993 | | | | | 173 (Ontario, Canada) | |
| Granniwinkle | US | | Sweet | 0.30 | 1045 (Washington, US) | 0.08 | 128 (Washington, US) | |
| Gravenstein Red | Denmark/US | | Sharp | 0.56 | 1052 (Washington, US) | 0.07 | 126 (Washington, US) | |
| Great Britain | Devonshire | | Sharp | | | | | |
| Green Bittersweet | Devonshire | | Bittersweet | | | | | |
| Grimes Golden | West Virginia, US | 1804 | Sharp | 0.61 | 1052 (Washington, US) | 0.07 | 149 (Ontario, Canada), 173 (Washington, US) | |
| Grindstone | | | Sharp | 0.58 | 1061 (Washington, US) | 0.10 | 178 (Washington, US) | |
| Guillevic | France | | Sharp | 0.58 | 1059 (France) | 0.135 | | |
| Hagloe Crab | Gloucestershire, England | <1880 | Sharp | | | | | |
| Hangdown (a.k.a. Pocket Apple) | Somerset or Devonshire, England | | Bittersweet | 0.20 | 1056 (Somerset, England) | 0.28 | 161 (Somerset, England) | |
| Harrison | New Jersey, US | 1770 | Sharp | 0.64 | 1061 (Washington, US) | 0.10 | 146 (Washington, US) | |
| Harry Masters Jersey | Somerset, England | <1900 | Bittersweet | 0.20 | 1056 (Somerset, England), 1051 (Washington, US) | 0.32 | 172 (Somerset, England), 146 (Washington, US) | |
| Hastings | Somerset, England | 2007 | Bittersweet | 0.13 | 1057 (Somerset, England) | 0.29 | 120 (Somerset, England) | |
| Hauxapfel | Germany | 1920 | Bittersharp | | | | | |
| Helen's Apple | Somerset, England | 2007 | Bittersweet | 0.10 | 1050 (Somerset, England) | 0.29 | 142 (Somerset, England) | |
| Hereford Broadleaf | Herefordshire, England | | TRI | | | | | |
| Honeystring | Somerset | | Sweet | | | | | |
| Idared | | | Sweet | 0.41 | 12.4 | 0.041 | | |
| Improved Dove | England | Early 1900s | Bittersweet | | | | | |
| Improved Lambrook Pippin | Somerset, England | <1960 | Sharp | | | | | |
| Improved Redstreak | England | <1940 | Bittersharp | | | | | |
| Jane | Somerset, England | 2007 | Bittersweet | 0.19 | 1052 (Somerset, England) | 0.33 | 118 (Somerset, England) | |
| Jaune de Vitré | France | | Sharp | 0.88 | 1060 (France) | | | |
| Jeanne Renard | France | | Bittersweet | 0.17 | 1065 (France) | 0.42 | | rBI |
| Joanna | Somerset, England | | Bittersweet | 0.11 | 1045 (France) | 0.22 | 128 (Somerset, England) | |
| Jonathan | | | Sharp | 0.58 | 13.0 | 0.046 | | |
| Jouveaux | France | | Bittersweet | 0.30 | 1052 (Washington, US) | 0.16 | 149 (Washington, US) | |
| Judaine | France | | Sharp | 0.67 | 1053 (France) | 0.075 | | sAS |
| Judeline | France | | Sharp | 0.50 | 1050 (France) | 0.07 | | sAS |
| Judin | France | | Sharp | 0.66 | 1060 (France) | 0.09 | | |
| Judor | France | | Sharp | 0.67 | 1052 (France) | 0.07 | | sAC |
| Juliana | France | | Sharp | 1.03 | 1061 (France) | 0.18 | | |
| Jurella | France | | Sharp | 0.85 | 1053 (France) | 0.06 | | sAS |
| Kaiser Wilhelm | Germany | 1864 | Bittersharp | 0.63 | 1055 (Germany) | | | |
| Kardinal Bea | Germany | | | | | | | |
| Kermerrien | France | | Bittersweet | 0.15 | 1062 (France), 1050 (Washington, US) | 0.43 | 142 (Washington, US) | |
| Kingston Bitter | | | | | | | 168 (Somerset, England) | |
| Kingston Black (a.k.a. Black Taunton) | Near Taunton, Somerset, England | Late 19th century | Bittersharp | 0.58 | 1061 (Somerset, England), 1055 (Washington, US) | 0.19 | 182 (Somerset, England), 112 (Ontario, Canada), 141 (Washington, US) | |
| Knotted Kernel | Somerset, England | <1842 | Bittersweet | 0.24 | 1059 (Somerset, England) | 0.34 | 188 (Somerset, England) | |
| Lagar | Spain | | Bittersharp | 0.60 | | 0.22 | | |
| Lambrook Pippin | Somerset, England | | Sharp | 0.58 | 1054 (Washington, US) | 0.24 | 160 (Washington, US) | |
| Langworthy (a.k.a. Wyatt's Seedling) | England | | Sharp | | | | | |
| Lavignée (a.k.a. Belle de Douai) | | | Bittersweet | 0.21 | 1049 (Somerset, England) | 0.27 | 182 (Somerset, England) | |
| Le Bret | Possibly England | | Sweet | | | | | |
| Limón Montés | Spain | | Sharp | 0.81 | | 0.12 | | |
| Lin | Spain | | Bittersharp | 0.71 | | 0.24 | | |
| Lizzy | Somerset, England | 2007 | Bittersweet | 0.17 | 1047 (Somerset, England) | 0.20 | 128 (Somerset, England) | |
| Locart Vert | France | | Sharp | | | | | sPM |
| London Pippin | England | 1580 | Sweet | 0.38 | 1047 (Somerset, England) | 0.11 | | |
| Lorna Doone | Somerset | | Sharp | | | | | |
| Loroñe | Spain | | Sharp | 0.61 | | 0.19 | | |
| Loroñesa | Spain | | Sharp | 0.55 | | 0.16 | | |
| Maggie | Somerset, England | 2007 | Sharp | 0.58 | 1052 (Somerset, England) | 0.14 | 125 (Somerset, England) | |
| Major | England | | Bittersweet | 0.18 | 1054 (Somerset, England), 1051 (Washington, US) | 0.41 | 150 (Somerset, England), 117 (Washington, US) | |
| Marialena | Spain | | | | | | | |
| Margil | | <1750 | Sharp | 0.57 | 1049 (Washington, US) | 0.07 | 152 | |
| Marie Ménard | France | | Bittersweet | 0.22 | 1061 (France), 1057 (Washington, US) | 0.48 | 143 (Washington, US) | |
| Mariñana | Spain | | Sharp | 0.60 | | 0.11 | | |
| Marin Onfroy | France | | Bittersweet | 0.17 | 1059 (France), 1053 (Washington, US) | 0.325 | 134 (Washington, US) | |
| Maud | France | | Sharp | 0.49 | 1050 (Washington, US) | 0.07 | 130 (Washington, US) | |
| Maundy | England | | Bittersweet | | | | | |
| Meana | Spain | | Sharp | 0.66 | | 0.19 | | |
| Médaille D'Or | France | <1850 | Bittersweet | 0.27 | 1059 (Somerset, England), 1059 (Washington, US) | 0.64 | 177 (Somerset, England), 128 (Ontario, Canada), 139 (Washington, US) | |
| Meriennet | France | | Bittersweet | | | | | |
| Merton Russet | | | Sharp | 0.82 | 13.6 | 0.034 | | |
| Mettais | France | | Bittersweet | 0.17 | 1063 (France), 1056 (Washington, US) | 0.38 | 138 (Washington, US) | |
| Merton Russet | Surrey, England | 1921 | Sharp | 0.82 | | | | |
| Michelin | France | 1872 | Bittersweet | 0.25 | 1050 (France), 1048 (Washington, US) | 0.23 | 172 (Somerset, England), 115 (Ontario, Canada), 153 (Washington, US) | |
| Miyares | Spain | | Sharp | 0.48 | | 0.15 | | |
| Mollies Delicious | | | Sweet | 0.15 | 10.7 | | | |
| Montoto | Spain | | Sharp | 0.57 | | 0.155 | | |
| Morgan Sweet | Somerset, England | | Sweet TRI | 0.22 | 1049 (Somerset, England) | 0.13 | 125 (Somerset, England) | |
| Mott Pink | France | | Sharp | 0.76 | 1043 (Washington, US) | 0.05 | 129 (Washington, US) | |
| Moulin á Vent | France | | Bittersweet | 0.26 | 1061 | 0.27 | | |
| Muscadet de Dieppe | France | | Bittersweet TRI | 0.21 | 1055 (France), 1057 (Washington, US) | 0.25 | 114 (Ontario, Canada), 127 (Washington, US) | |
| Muscat de Bernay | France | | Bittersweet | 0.28 | 1050 (Washington, US) | 0.19 | 161 (Washington, US) | |
| Naomi | Somerset, England | 2007 | Sweet | 0.28 | 1041 (Somerset, England) | 0.17 | 135 (Somerset, England) | |
| Nehou | France | <1920 | Bittersweet | 0.17 | 1057 (Somerset, England), 1056 (Washington, US) | 0.60 | 150 (Somerset, England), 151 (Washington, US) | |
| Neverblight | Somerset | | Sharp | | | | | |
| Newtown Pippin se also Yellow Newtown | Queens County, New York, US | c. 1750 | | | | | | |
| No Prieta Antigua | Spain | | Sweet | 0.10 | | 0.086 | | |
| Northern Spy | | | Sharp | 0.70 | 13.2 | 0.048 | | |
| Northwood | Devon, England | c. 1800 | Sweet | 0.27 | 1049 (Somerset, England) | 0.17 | 182 (Somerset, England) | |
| Norton Bitter | Somerset | | Sharp | | | | | |
| Obdulina | Spain | | Sweet | 0.37 | | 0.155 | | |
| Omont | France | | Bittersweet TRI | 0.19 | 1063 | 0.22 | | |
| Orange Pippin | France or UK | <1800 | | | | | | |
| Osier | England | | Bittersweet | | | | | |
| Paignton Marigold | Devon England | <1834 | Bittersweet | | | | | |
| Panquerina | Spain | | Sharp | 0.55 | | 0.12 | | |
| Paraguas | Spain | | Sweet | 0.31 | | 0.09 | | |
| Parda Blanquera | Spain | | Sharp-bittersharp | 0.71 | | 0.20 | | |
| Parda Carreño | Spain | | Sharp | 0.57 | | 0.10 | | |
| Pardona | Spain | | Sharp | 0.93 | | 0.12 | | |
| Peau de Chien | France | | Bittersweet | 0.22 | 1065 (France) | 0.30 | | sBI |
| Peau de Vache | France | | Sweet | 0.26 | 1048 (Washington, US) | 0.14 | 140 (Washington, US) | |
| Pennard Bitter | Somerset, England | <1900 | Bittersweet | | | | | |
| Pepa | Spain | | Sweet | 0.21 | | 0.10 | | |
| Perezosa | Spain | | Sharp | 0.55 | | 0.075 | | |
| Perico | Spain | | Sharp | 0.59 | | 0.12 | | |
| Pethyre | Monmouthshire, Wales | 1920s | Bittersweet | | | | | |
| Petit Amer | France | | Bittersweet | 0.20 | 1055 (France) | 0.44 | | |
| Petit Jaune | France | | Sharp | 0.74 | 1055 (France) | 0.12 | | sAS, rBI |
| Pomme de Bouet | France | | Sharp | | | | | |
| Ponsford | Devonshire | <1880 | Sharp | | | | | |
| Porters Perfection | Somerset, England | <1900 | Bittersharp | 0.82 | 1054 (Somerset, England), 1054 (Washington, US) | 0.25 | 199 (Somerset, England), 141 (Ontario, Canada), 147 (Washington, US) | |
| Pound | Devonshire | | Sweet | | | | | |
| Poveshon | Essex County, New Jersey, US | 18th century | | | | | | |
| Prieta | Spain | | Sharp | 0.58 | | 0.10 | | |
| Prince William | England | 2007 | Bittersweet | 0.15 | 1057 | 0.25 | | |
| Puget Spice | | | Bittersharp | 0.96 | 1057 (Washington, US) | 0.13 | 173 (Washington, US) | |
| Queen Cox | | | Sharp | 0.59 | 12.5 | 0.043 | | |
| Queue Torte | France | | Sweet | | | | | |
| Rambault | France | | Sharp | 0.64 | 1061 (France) | 0.14 | | |
| Rawlings | Devonshire | | Sweet | | | | | |
| Raxao | Spain | | Sharp | 0.78 | | 0.08 | | |
| Red Jersey (a.k.a. Loral Drain) | Somerset, England | 1895 | Bittersweet | 0.63 | 1052 (Somerset, England) | 0.48 | 143 (Somerset, England) | |
| Red Norman | Herefordshire | <1880 | Bittersweet | | | | | |
| Red Spitzenberg | | | sharp | 0.77 | 16.0 | 0.052 | | |
| Red Stayman Winesap | | | Sharp | 0.51 | 15.1 | 0.060 | | |
| Redstreak | Herefordshire, England | c. 1630 | Sharp | 0.95 | 1048 (Washington, US) | 0.09 | 121 (Washington, US) | |
| Red Worthy | Somerset | | Bittersweet | | | | | |
| Regona | Spain | | Sharp | 1.07 | | 0.145 | | |
| Reine des Hatives | Normandy, France | 1872 | Bittersweet | 0.24 | 1044 (Washington, US) | 0.27 | 143 (Washington, US) | |
| Reine des Pommes | France | | Bittersweet | 0.41 | 1063 (Washington, US) | 0.52 | 184 (Somerset, England), 149 (Washington, US) | |
| Reineta Encarnada | Spain | | Sharp | 0.55 | | 0.11 | | |
| Reinette Obry | | | | | | | 167 (Somerset, England) | |
| Reinette Russet | France | 1979 | | 1.0 | | | | |
| Rénao | France | | Sharp | | | | | |
| René Martin | France | | Sharp | 0.76 | 1053 (France) | 0.14 | | |
| Repinaldo Gozón | Spain | | Sweet | 0.32 | | 0.08 | | |
| Repinaldo Hueso | Spain | | Sharp | 0.61 | | 0.13 | | |
| Ribston Pippin | England | 1708 | Sharp | 0.67 | 1060 (Washington, US) | 0.11 | 142 (Washington, US) | |
| Rosemary Russet | | | Sharp | 0.86 | 1055 (Washington, US) | 0.07 | 152 (Washington, US) | |
| Ross Nonpareil | England | | Sharp | 0.68 | 1059 (Washington, US) | 0.15 | 154 (Washington, US) | |
| Rouge Duret | France | | Sweet | 0.17 | 1049 (France) | 0.16 | | |
| Rousse de la Sarthe | France | | Sweet | 0.17 | 1056 (France) | 0.16 | | |
| Roxbury Russet | Massachusetts, US | c. 1640s | Sharp | 0.61–0.80 | 1061 (Washington, US) | 0.08–0.11 | 143 (Washington, US) | |
| Royal Jersey | Somerset, England | | Bittersweet | 0.19 | 1048 (Washington, US) | 0.36 | 126 (Washington, US) | |
| Royal Somerset (Copas) | Somerset | | Sharp | | | | | |
| Royal Wilding | Herefordshire, England | | Bittersweet | 0.23 | 1053 (Somerset, England) | 0.24 | | |
| Russet King | | | Sharp | 0.71 | 1053 (Washington, US) | 0.05 | 153 (Washington, US) | |
| Saint Martin | France | | Bittersweet | 0.20 | 1055 (France) | 0.23 | | |
| Sebin Blanc | France | | Sharp | 0.54 | 1051 (France) | 0.14 | | |
| Severn Bank | England | | Sharp | | | | | |
| Sherrington Norman | | | Bittersharp | 0.27 | 1051 (Somerset, England) | 0.33 | 167 (Somerset, England) | |
| Sibirian Bittersweet | England | c. 1810 | | | | | | |
| Sibirian Harvey | England | 1807 | | | | | | |
| Silver Cup | Somerset | | Bittersweet | | | | | |
| Slack-ma-Girdle | Devon, England | <1880 | Sweet | 0.27 | 1052 (Somerset, England) | 0.14 | | |
| Smith's Cider | | | Sharp | 0.55 | 1050 (Washington, US) | 0.08 | 152 (Washington, US) | |
| Solarina | Spain | | Sharp | 0.55 | | 0.16 | | |
| Somerset Redstreak | Somerset, England | <1917 | Bittersweet | 0.19 | 1050 (Somerset, England) | 0.35 | 148 (Somerset, England) | |
| Sops in Wine | England | 1600s | Sweet | | | | | |
| Spicey Pippin | Devonshire | | Sharp | | | | | |
| Stable Jersey | Somerset, England | | Bittersweet | | | | | |
| Stead's Kernel | Herefordshire, England | <1875 | | | | | | |
| Stembridge Cluster | Somerset, England | | Bittersharp | | | | | |
| Stembridge Jersey | Somerset, England | c. 1950 | Bittersweet | 0.37 | 1047 (Washington, US) | 0.27 | 137 (Washington, US) | |
| Stoke Red | Rodney Stoke, Somerset, England | <1920 | Bittersharp | 0.64 | 1052 (Somerset, England), 1045 (Washington, US) | 0.31 | 191 (Somerset, England), 102 (Ontario, Canada), 134 (Washington, US) | |
| Strawberry Norman | Herefordshire, England | <1900 | Bittersweet | 0.32 | 1053 | 0.36 | | TRI |
| Styre | Forest of Dean, England | Before 1600 | | | | | | |
| Sugar Loaf | Devonshire | | Sweet | | | | | |
| Sugar Sweet | Devonshire | | Sweet | | | | | |
| Sweet Alford | Devon, England | | Sweet | 0.22 | 1052 (Somerset, England), 1049 (Washington, US) | 0.15 | 174 (Somerset, England), 144 (Ontario, Canada), 156 (Washington, US) | |
| Sweet Bramley | Devonshire | | Sweet | | | | | |
| Sweet Coopin | Devon, England | <1800 | Sweet | 0.20 | 1052 (Somerset, England) | 0.14 | 178 (Somerset, England) | |
| Tale Sweet | Devonshire, England | | Sweet | | | | | |
| Taliaferro | | | Sharp | 0.77 | 1047 | 0.09 | 147 (Washington, US) | |
| Tan Harvey | Cornwall, England | | Bittersweet | | | | | |
| Tardive de la Sarthe | France | | Bittersweet | 0.20 | 1059 (France) | 0.37 | | |
| Tardive Forestiere | France | <1900 | Bittersweet | | | | 183 (Somerset, England) | |
| Taylor's Sweet (a.k.a. Taylor's) | Somerset, England | <1900 | Sweet-bittersweet | 0.20 | 1051 (Washington, US) | 0.14 | 128 (Washington, US) | |
| Teórica | Spain | | Sharp | 0.80 | | 0.08 | | |
| Tesniére | Franc | | Sharp | 0.56 | 1055 | 0.16 | | |
| Three Counties | Somerset, England | 2007 | Bittersweet | 0.20 | 1056 | 0.30 | 137 (Somerset, England) | |
| Tina | Somerset, England | 2007 | Bittersweet | 0.18 | 1055 | 0.25 | 125 (Somerset, England) | |
| Tolman Sweet | US | 1822 | | | | | 136 (Ontario, Canada) | |
| Tom Putt | England | | Sharp | 0.65 | 1052 (Somerset, England), 1044 (Washington, US) | 0.13 | 120 | TRI |
| Track Zero | | | Sweet | 0.18 | 1053 (Washington, US) | 0.10 | 160 (Washington, US) | |
| Tramlett's Geneva | | | Sharp | 1.01 | 1044 (Washington, US) | 0.17 | 148 (Washington, US) | |
| Tremlett's Bitter | Exe Valley, England | c. 1820 | Bittersweet | 0.27 | 1052 (Somerset, England) | 0.34 | 174 | |
| Twistbody Jersey | England | | Sweet | 0.12 | 10.0 | 0.058 | | |
| Tydemans Late Orange | England | 1949 | | | | | 152 (Ontario, Canada) | |
| Upright French | Dorset, England | | Bittersweet | | | | | |
| Vagon Archer | England | | Bittersweet | | | | | |
| Verdialona | Spain | | Sweet | 0.34 | | 0.09 | | |
| Vicky | Somerset, England | 2007 | Sweet | 0.15 | 1050 | 0.14 | 125 (Somerset, England) | |
| Vilberie | France | <1900 | Bittersweet TRI | 0.27 | 1044 (Washington, US) | 0.41 | 169 (Somerset, England), 148 (Washington, US) | |
| Virginia Crab | | | Bittersharp | 0.91 | 1060 (Washington, US) | 0.19 | 134 (Washington, US) | |
| Wagener | | | Sharp | 0.47 | 11.0 | 0.038 | | |
| Weisser Trier Weinapfel | Possibly Germany | <1890 | Bittersharp | 0.84 | | | | |
| Westerly Red | Germany or Austria | <1790 | Sweet | 0.62 | 1070 (Germany) | | | |
| Whidbey | | | Sharp | 0.69 | 1049 (Washington, US) | 0.12 | 134 | |
| Whimple Queen | Devonshire | | Sweet | | | | | |
| Whimple Wonder | Devonshire | | Sweet | | | | | |
| White Close Pippin | Somerset or Devonshire, England | | Bittersweet | | | | | |
| White Jersey | Somerset, England | 1895 | Bittersweet | 0.29 | 1051 | 0.26 | | |
| White Norman (a.k.a. White Hereford) | Herefordshire, England | <1900 | Bittersweet | 0.20 | 1056 (Somerset, England) | 0.32 | 155 (Somerset, England) | |
| Winesap | US | c. 1817 | Bittersharp | 0.51 | 12.7 | 0.054 | | |
| Winter Banana | Indiana, US | 1876 | Sweet | 0.41 | 12.9 | 0.076 | | |
| Winterrambour | Germany | 1864 | Bittersweet | 0.36 | | | | |
| Woodbine 1 (a.k.a. Rice's Jersey) | Somerset, England | | Sweet | 0.29 | 1052 (Somerset, England) | 0.15 | | |
| Woodbine 2 (a.k.a. Slack-ma-Girdle) | | | | | | | | |
| Woodcock | Gloucestershire, England | c. 1600 | | | | | | |
| Xuanina | Spain | | Sharp | 0.75 | | 0.10 | | |
| Yarlington Mill | Somerset, England | 1898 | Bittersweet | 0.22 | 1052 (Somerset, England), 1048 (Washington, US) | 0.32 | 183 (Somerset, England), 139 (Ontario, Canada), 136 (Washington, US) | |
| Yellow Elliot | England | <1700 | | | | | | |
| Yellow Newtown | | | Sharp | 0.56 | 11.0 | 0.040 | | |
| Yeovil Sour | Yeovil, Somerset, England | c. 1824 | Bittersharp | 0.55 | 1052 (Washington, US) | 0.15 | | |
| Zabergäu Renette | Germany | 1875 | Sharp | 0.79 | 1057 (Washington, US) | 0.12 | 146 (Washington, US) | |

== Rootstock cultivars ==
Selection of rootstock cultivars can be difficult: vigorous roots tend to give trees that are healthy but grow too tall to be harvested easily without careful pruning, while dwarfing rootstocks result in small trees that are easy to harvest from, but are often shorter-lived and sometimes less healthy. Most modern commercial orchards use one of the "Malling series" (a.k.a. 'M' series), introduced or developed by the East Malling Research Station from the early 20th century onward. However, a great deal of work has been done recently introducing new rootstocks in Poland, the U.S. (Geneva), and other nations. The Polish rootstocks are often used where cold hardiness is needed. The Geneva series of rootstocks has been developed to resist important diseases such as fireblight and collar rot, as well as for high fruit productivity.

== See also ==
- Cooking apple
- Lists of cultivars
- List of apple dishes
- List of Japanese apple cultivars
- Welsh apples
