= Michelin (apple) =

Apple cultivar

'Michelin'
- Species: Malus domestica
- Origin: France, 1870s

Michelin is a variety of cider apple commonly grown in commercial orchards in the United Kingdom, although originating in France.

== History ==
'Michelin' was raised by the nurseryman Legrand of Yvetot, Normandy, and first fruited in 1872. It was named for the pomologist Henri Michelin who carried out a great deal of study into cider fruits. It was first brought to England in 1883 or 1884 by members of the Woolhope Naturalists Club of Hereford, who visited a Rouen horticultural show with the aim of proving a link between the so-called "Norman" cider apple varieties of Herefordshire and genuine Normandy cultivars. Although they were unable to find any similar varieties, they did bring back several apples including 'Michelin' and 'Medaille d'Or'.

'Michelin' proved to be an extremely heavy cropping and reliable cider apple. Although rare in France, by the 20th century it had become the most planted cider variety in England, especially in conjunction with 'Dabinett' (notably in orchards planted for the Taunton Cider Company).

== Characteristics ==
'Michelin' is a mid-season, medium 'bittersweet' apple, relatively high in sugars, low in malic acid, and high in tannins. Its avoidance of biennial fruiting tendencies makes it a reliable cropper, though its juice makes a relatively characterless cider unless blended with other varieties.

Its medium-small sized, green apples bear a close resemblance to the variety 'Brown Snout' without the latter's characteristic patch of russetting.
