= Golden Sweet =

Malus domestica 'Golden Sweet'
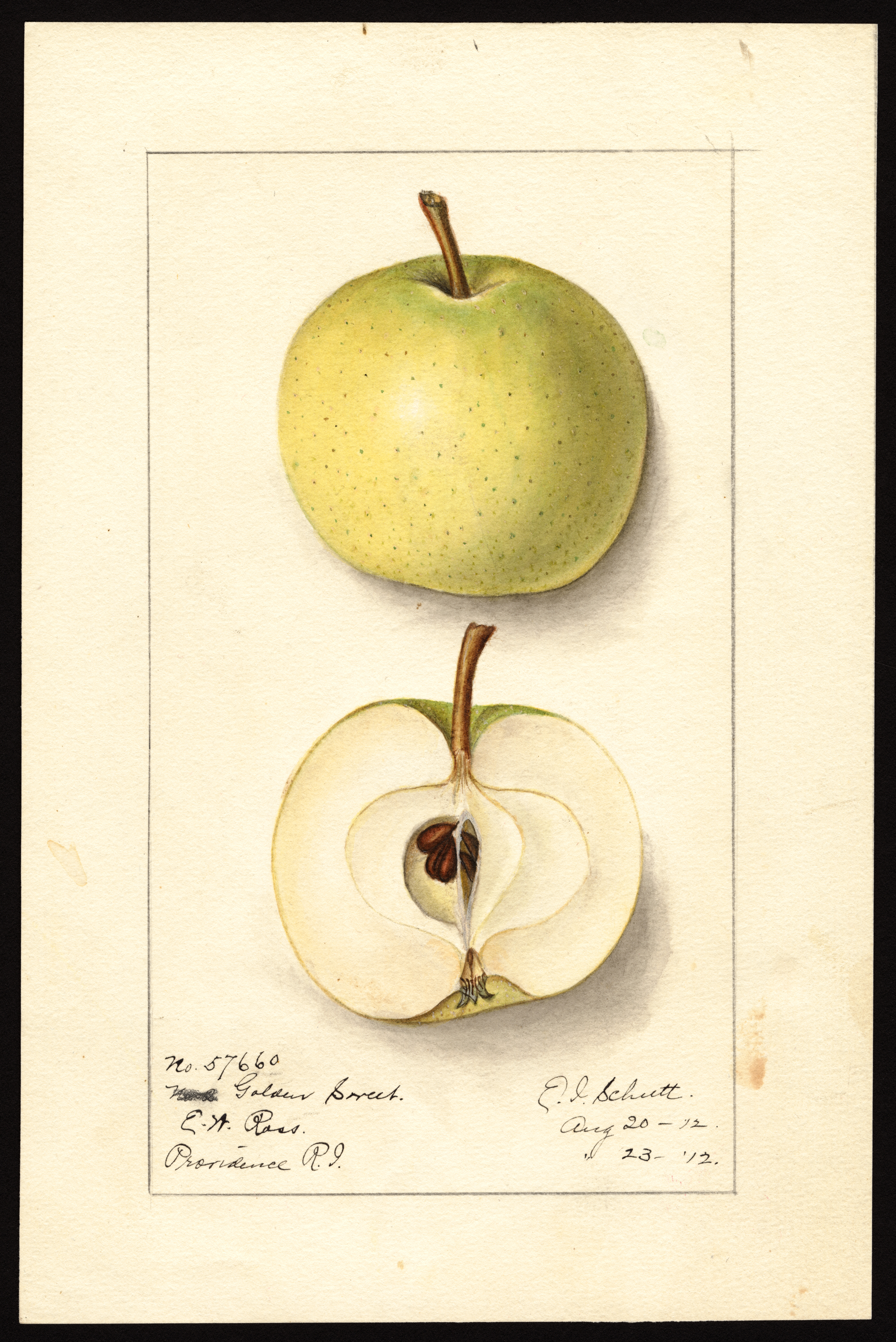
- Golden Sweet apple
- Species: Malus domestica
- Origin: (Connecticut) , 1832

Golden Sweet is a cultivar of domesticated apple.

== The origin of the Golden Sweet apple ==
The apple originated in the American state of Connecticut, but beyond that, its parentage is a mystery.

== Description ==
A Golden Sweet apple is a medium- to large-sized apple.

Golden Sweet tend to bear apples, every other year. Golden Sweet apples usually ripen from late July through early August, though this depends on the area. The harvest may continue into September.

The flavor of a Golden Sweet apple is very sweet, rich, and has almost no tartness. The flavor has been described as "honey sweet". Golden Sweet has no acid flavor.

== Uses ==
Golden Sweet apples are good for fresh-eating, also for apple sauce or apple cider.

== See also ==
- Tolman Sweet, a similar, but not quite the same apple

== External links and references ==
- One reference
