= Woodcock (apple) =

Apple cultivar

'Woodcock'
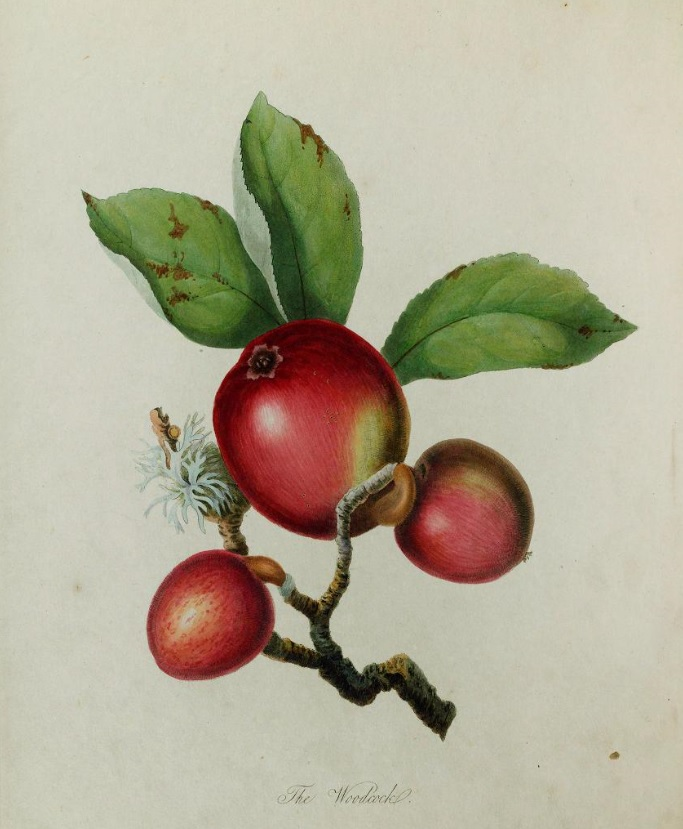
- Species: Malus domestica
- Origin: England, 1600s.

The Woodcock was one of the oldest described English varieties of cider apple. It originated in the West of England in the counties of Herefordshire and Gloucestershire.

== Description ==
Hogg described the apple as medium-sized, oval, with a distinctive fleshy, curved stalk of about three-quarters of an inch in length: the skin was yellow with a soft red flush, deeper on the sunward side. The tree itself was large and vigorous, forming large branches in the manner of a pear tree.

The varieties' name was popularly supposed to refer to the stalk's resemblance to the head of a woodcock; but Thomas Andrew Knight, who described and illustrated the apple in his Pomona Herefordiensis, surmised that its name was originally that of the person who first raised the variety. In Welsh the Woodcock was known as afal coes y dryw or afal coeshir y gwin, both names referring to the fruit's distinctive stem.

== History ==
The Woodcock was noted by writers as far back as the 17th century, making it one of the earliest described varieties. John Evelyn described it as one of the principal "Gloucestershire cider-fruit" in his work Sylva. John Philips, in Book 2 of his poem Cyder (1708), described how juice of the Woodcock was blended with that of other apples to create "a pleasurable Medly".

By the 19th century the variety was said to be in decline and little planted. The Somerset grower John Scott (1807–86) noted that it was still in existence in the late 19th century, describing it as a "beautiful light red apple". The variety is now thought to be lost, though a correspondent to The Gardeners' Chronicle, writing in 1932, stated that after "long hunting and enquiry about the orchards" they thought that the Monmouthshire variety "Frederick" was closely related or identical to the old Woodcock.
