= Poveshon =

Apple cultivar

The Poveshon, sometimes "Povershon", is an 18th-century American cider apple, primarily used for the production of apple cider. Grown in New Jersey before and after the American Revolution, it became obsolete by the 20th century as the cider industry in the state declined. It is considered lost, though it has possibly been rediscovered.

== Historical description ==
The Poveshon was one of the many popular apple varieties that were made into cider in New Jersey. It is from the same apple growing region on the slopes of the Watchung Mountains in Essex County where the Harrison, Campfield, and Granniwinkle also originate.

In A View of the Cultivation of Fruit Trees, and the Management of Orchards and Cider published in 1817 by William Coxe, the Poveshon is described as:

This is a fine cider fruit in September and October, when it ripens and falls from the tree. The size is small, the form flat, the skin smooth and of a deep red with rich yellow flesh, which is sweet, and uncommonly dry. The skin of this apple is full of dark red blotches running longitudinally, with small white spots; the tree grows very straight, with upright branches, and is a great bearer.

In The Fruits and Fruit Trees of America by Andrew Jackson Downing, it is described as:

An old New Jersey apple valued mainly for making early cider. Fruit small, oblate, deep red. Flesh yellow, dry, sweet. Good. September, October.

== Contemporary history ==
The tree is possibly lost. It has been sought for many years by those who wish to save it as part of American agricultural history and to bring it back into cultivation for cider production. A tree found in upstate New York in 2015 is believed to fit the description of the tree from 19th century texts. It has yet to be proven to be the Poveshon and not one of the thousands of other American apple varieties which have been lost.
