= Ellis Bitter =

Apple cultivar

'Ellis Bitter'
- Species: Malus domestica
- Breeder: Ellis, Newton St. Cyres
- Origin: England, mid 19th c.

Ellis Bitter, also called Ellis's Bitter or Ellis's Bitter-Sweet, is an English cider apple originating in Devon, but now widely planted across the west of England.

== History ==
The variety's exact origin is unknown, though it was first planted around Crediton, Devon, in the 19th century, and was sometimes thought to have arisen on the farm of a Mr Ellis at Newton St. Cyres in the middle years of the century. It was subsequently widely planted across the region by commercial growers, particularly those under contract to H. P. Bulmer. In the 20th century after being included in trial plantings by the Long Ashton Research Station, and because of its early cropping characteristics allowed extension of the harvesting season forward.

Ellis Bitter is still found in modern commercial orchards, in additional to 'traditional' orchards.

== Characteristics ==
The apple is a medium 'bittersweet', with low levels of malic acid and moderate tannins. The fruit is medium-sized and conical, with a slightly flattened shape. The skin is yellow and waxy with an orange-red striped flush, and russetted lenticels.

The tree is extremely vigorous and consistently self-sterile, and has good disease resistance.
