= Hewe's Crab =

Apple cultivar

Malus 'Hewe's Crab'
- Genus: Malus
- Cultivar: 'Hewe's Crab'
- Origin: Virginia, United States, pre 1755

The Hewe's Crab (also called Virginia Crab, Hughes's Crab and Red Hughes, is a small-sized apple that was popular for cider making in the southern United States in the 18th and 19th centuries and was grown at Monticello by Thomas Jefferson.

== See also ==
- Heirloom plants
