= Major (apple) =

Apple cultivar

'Major'
- Species: Malus domestica
- Origin: England.

Major is a cider apple cultivar first grown in the United Kingdom in the area of Devon and Somerset.

== Characteristics ==
Major is a 'bittersweet' under the categorisation system developed in 1903 by the Long Ashton Research Station, its fruit being high in tannins and relatively low in acidity. A long established variety dating from the 19th century or earlier, it was historically found in old farm orchards across South Devon and east of the Blackdown Hills in Somerset.

A triploid variety, young trees of 'Major' are very vigorous in growth meaning it is unsuitable for use with some large-growing rootstocks. It bears early in the season. The fruit are fairly typical of Somerset "Jersey" (bittersweet) apples, and are medium sized with a pinkish red flush.

'Major' is amongst the cultivars classified as of 'vintage' quality, i.e. capable of making single-varietal cider.
