= Bailey Sweet =

Apple cultivar

Malus pumila 'Bailey Sweet'
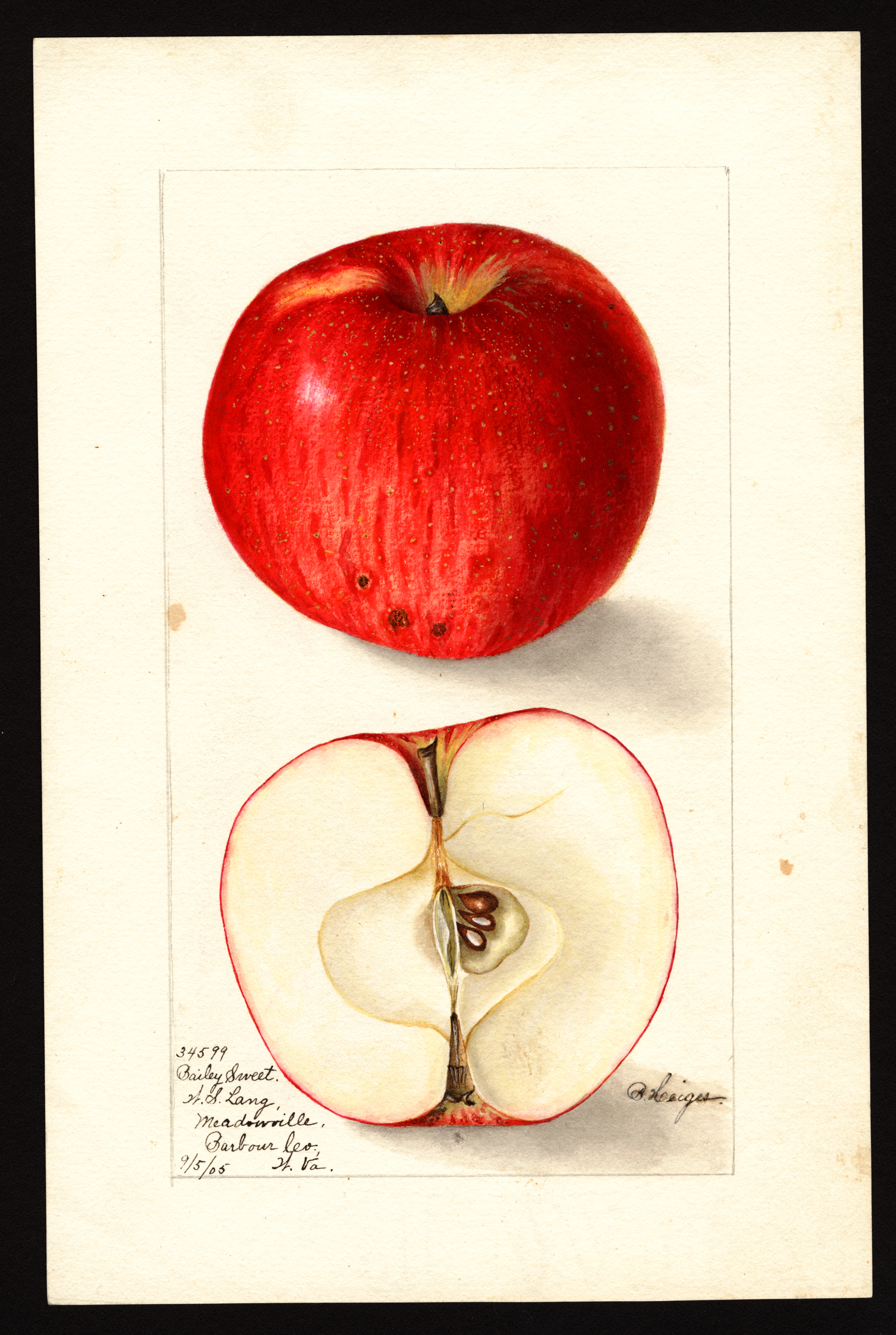
- Bailey Sweet
- Species: Malus pumila
- Cultivar: 'Bailey Sweet'
- Origin: (United States) , Petty, Wyoming County, New York State

Bailey Sweet, also referred to as Bailey's Sweet or just Bailey, is a cultivar of the domesticated apple. Bailey Sweets were first farmed around 1840 in Perry, Wyoming County, New York. Other names for it have included Edgerly Sweet, Howard's Sweet, and Paterson's Sweet.

== Appearance and flavor ==
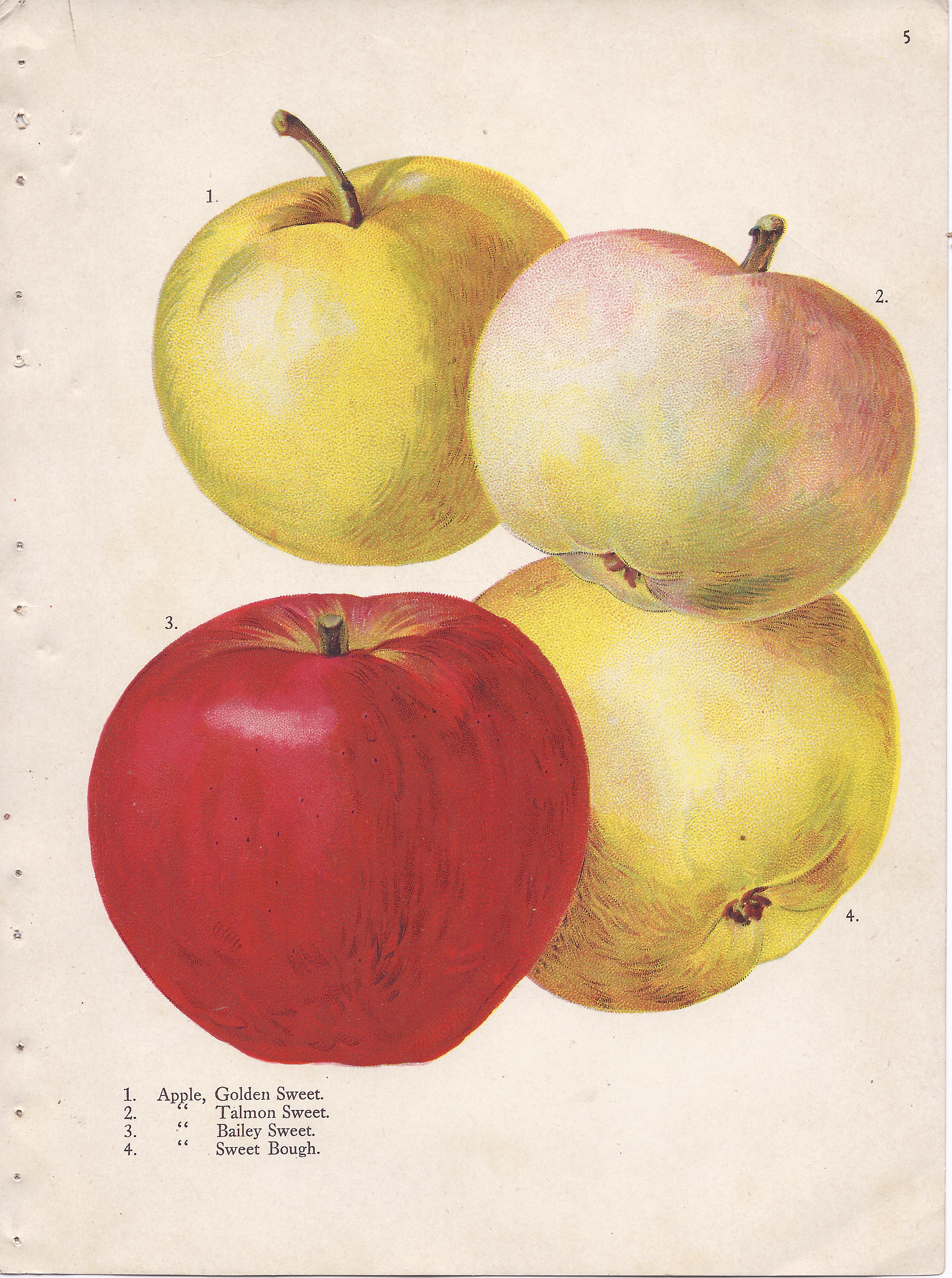
The Bailey Sweet is the red apple

Bailey Sweet apples are medium- to large-sized apples. They tend spherical, if at times conical. The skin is red and the flesh is yellowish and crisp.

Bailey Sweets are for eating, not cooking. The flesh is juicy and "distinctly sweet". They are in season beginning in October to January or February.

== Cultivation ==
Bailey Sweet apples are not recommended for cultivation. The trees are typically productive, but unless sprayed, they tend to produce a high percentage of low-grade fruits. It is susceptible to disease.

The fruits are sometimes "scabby and knotty" when grown in certain areas and they generally do not store well.
