= Crimson King (apple) =

Apple cultivar

'Crimson King'
- Species: Malus domestica
- Breeder: John Toucher, Chardstock
- Origin: England, 19th c.

Crimson King, also known as John Toucher's or the Bewley Down Pippin, is a traditional cider apple cultivar originating in Somerset.

== Origin ==
The cultivar was raised in the late 19th century by John Toucher of Bewley Down, Chardstock. It was first widely planted in western Somerset, and subsequently in Devon and other West Country cider producing areas.

== Characteristics ==
The fruit is generally medium to large, variable in shape, and red-skinned. In the standard classification of cider apples Crimson King is a (medium to full) "sharp", being high in acidity but low in tannin.

Crimson King is triploid and mid to late bearing. It makes a vigorous, spreading tree and was reputed to bear heavy crops without much tendency to biennial cropping, although it is fairly prone to apple scab.
