= Winter Banana =

Apple cultivar

'Winter Banana'
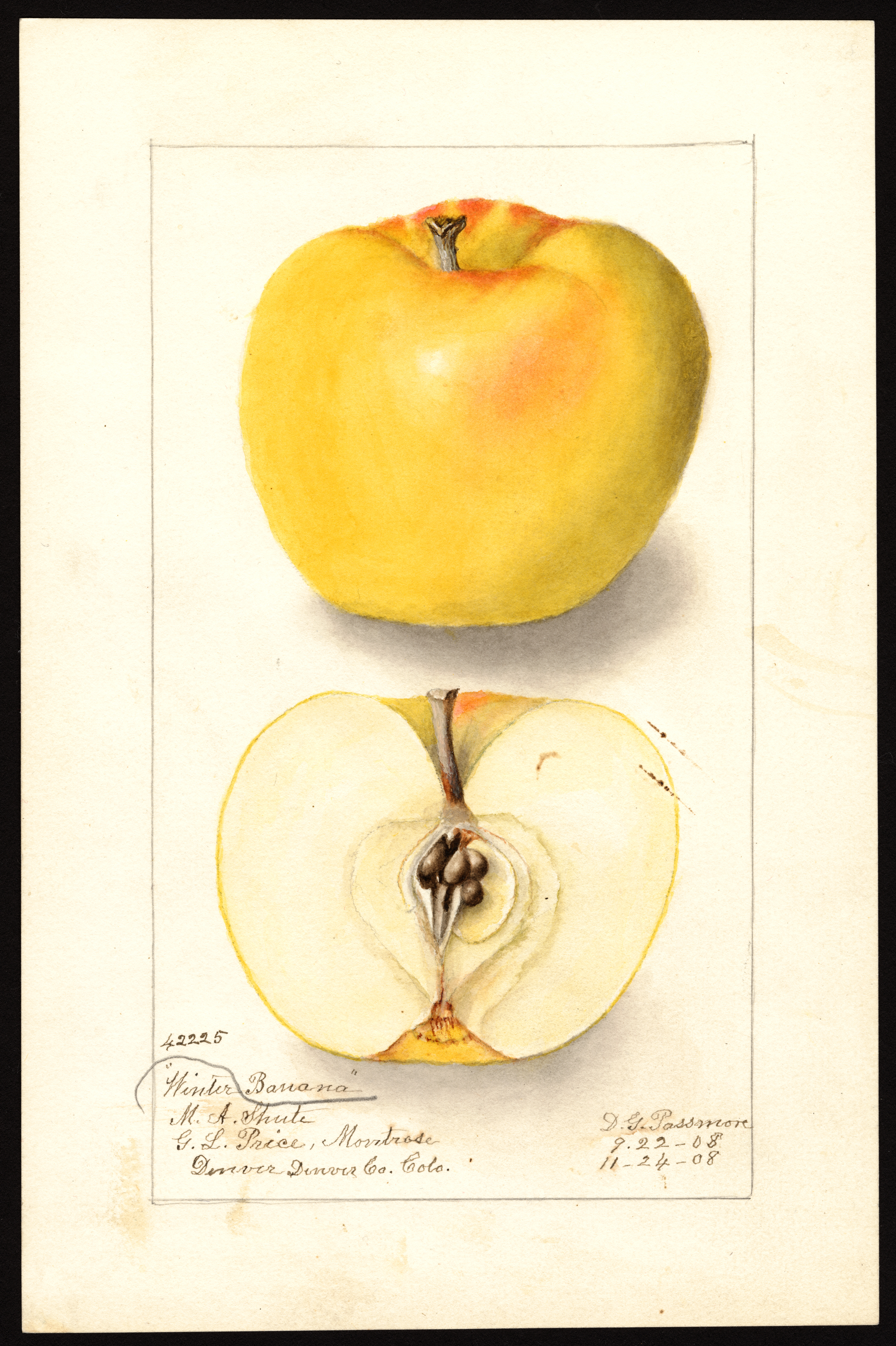
- Genus: Malus
- Species: M. domestica
- Cultivar: 'Winter Banana'
- Origin: Cass County, Indiana, 1876, introduced 1890

'Winter Banana' is an apple cultivar with high-quality fruit used for fresh eating. The fruit is large, with smooth yellow skin that bruises more easily than red apples do. The flesh is rather coarse textured, moderately soft, sweet and aromatic. Sugar 12.5%, acid 7 g/litre, vitamin C 12 mg/100 g. Pectine 0.52–0.73%. Typical size height 78 mm, width 74 mm, stalk 16 mm.

Winterbanana
----	When to pick	When ripe enough to eat	Latest cold storage limit
In Northern states	Oct. 3–17	Nov. 15–25	March 15
In Southern states	Sept. 18–25	Oct 20 – Dec. 5	Feb. 15
