= Amanda (apple) =

- Species: Malus Domestica
- Origin: Somerset, United Kingdom

Amanda is a cider apple cultivar that produces heavy crops of large to medium, bittersweet fruit. The apples are typically greenish-yellow, variably flushed with red.

== Description ==
This cultivar typically grows to a height and spread of 4 to 8 meters, taking 10 to 20 years to reach full maturity. It blooms with white or pink flowers in the spring, followed by fruit that ripens in the autumn.

== Conditions ==
This cultivar thrives in full sun positions with a south-facing or west-facing aspect, in a sheltered exposure. It has a hardiness rating of H6 and adapts to a range of soil types, including clay, loam, and sand. The soil should be moist yet well-drained, with a pH that can range from acidic to alkaline or neutral.

== Origin ==
Developed by Liz Copas and Ray Williams at the Long Ashton Research Station, this variety was part of a 1985–2003 breeding program to provide England's commercial cider industry with earlier-ripening bittersweet apples. Using parent varieties like Michelin and Dabinett, the station produced 29 new varieties released by 2008. These are popularly known as "The Girls" because most were given female names.
