= Kingston Black =

Apple cultivar

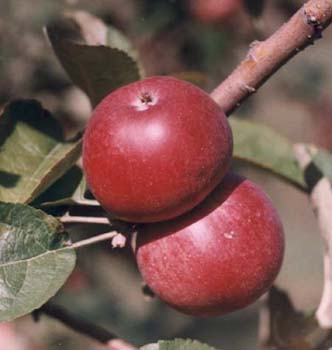
- Species: Malus domestica
- Origin: England

The Kingston Black, also known as Black Taunton, is a cultivar of apple originating from the United Kingdom and used in making cider. The name of the cultivar comes from the apples' dark red or purplish skin, though despite the name, the fruit does not have a black hue.

== History ==
The apple was first grown in orchards around the parish of Kingston St Mary in Somerset, whose inhabitants referred to it simply as the "black apple".

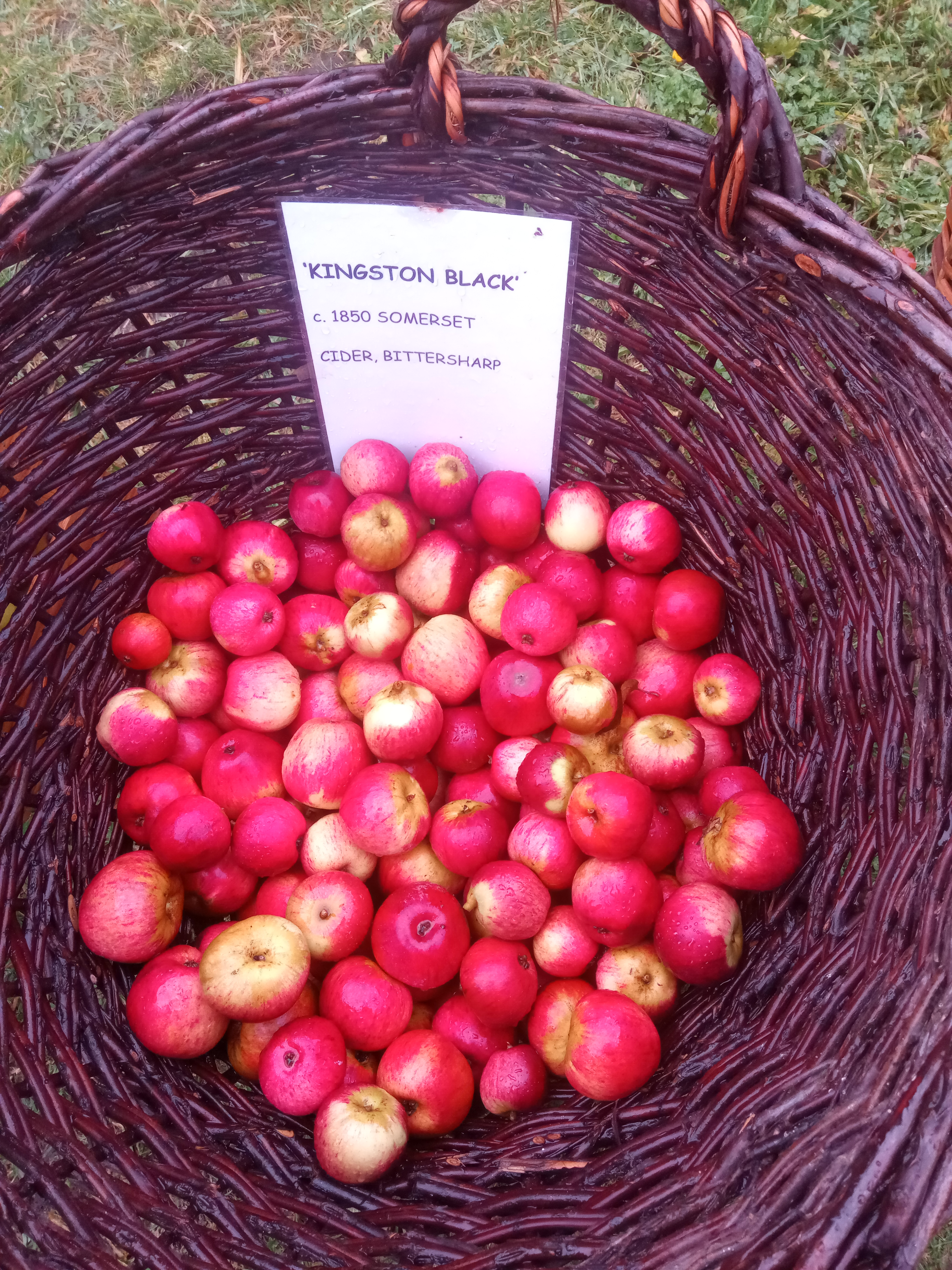
At Priorwood Garden

Kingston Black is capable of making a distinctive single-variety cider, and its value in cidermaking meant that by the early 19th century it became more well known. By 1950, the Long Ashton Research Station referred to it as "more widely grown than any other cider apple" in the West of England. Despite this popularity, one former Long Ashton staff member wrote that many thought the variety's fame as a vintage quality apple was "somewhat exaggerated", and Hogg quoted a Taunton nurseryman as stating that Kingston Black "of itself makes a thin cider, but a few only communicate a high colour to other ciders".

In later years, use of Kingston Black declined in commercial orchards due to the variety's tendency to poor cropping and its susceptibility to canker and apple scab.

== Characteristics ==
The Kingston Black is classed as a "bittersharp" in the standard classification of cider apples, being high in both tannin and acid. The tree is strongly biennial in fruiting, and can be prone to common apple diseases. Its fruit is small, round in shape, yellow skinned with red streaks on the shade side of the fruit or dark red with dark purple streaks on the sunward side, and patches of grey russetting.

USDA Zones: 5,6,7,8,9
