= Slack-ma-Girdle =

Apple cultivar

'Slack-ma-Girdle'
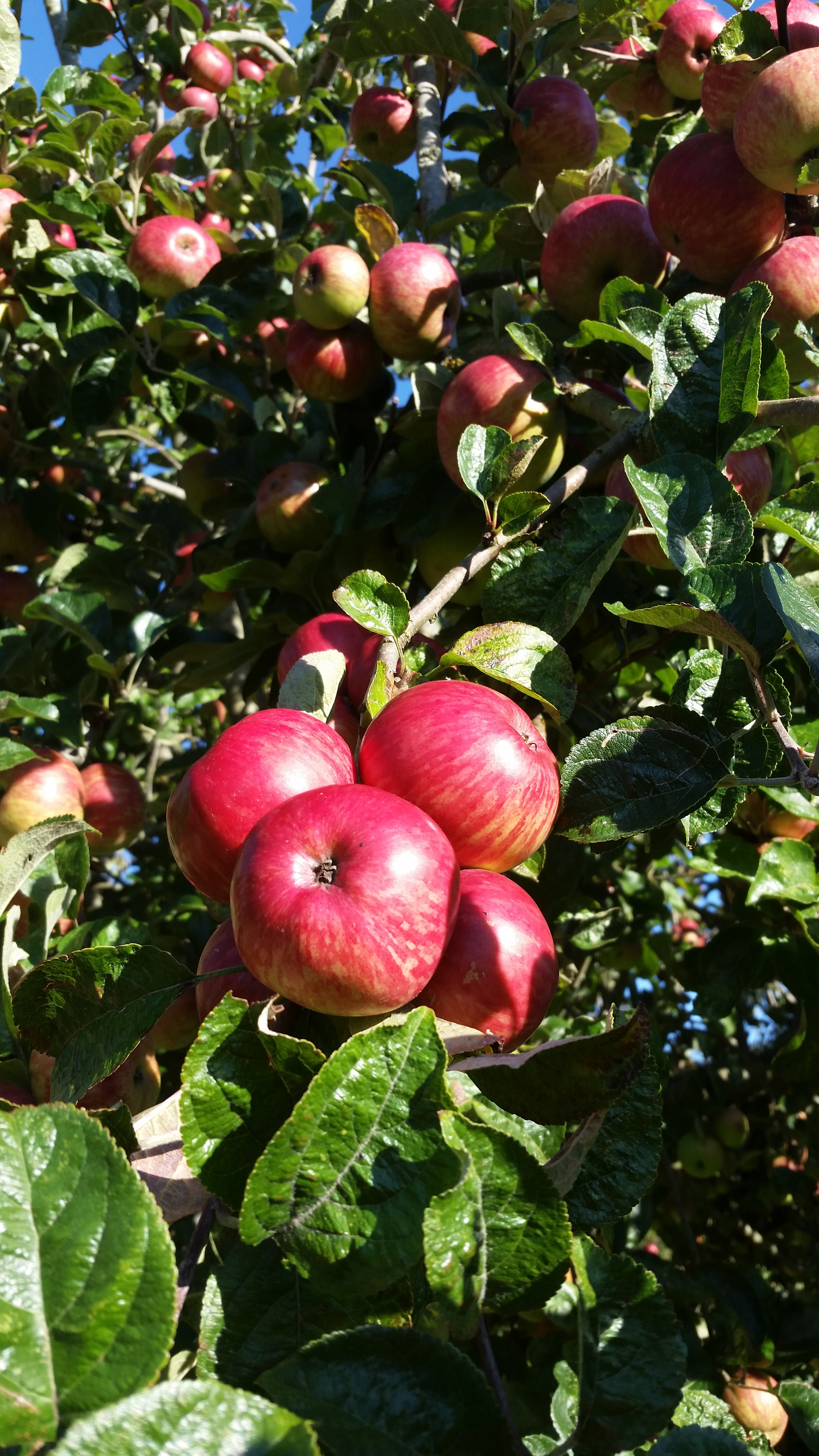
- Species: Malus domestica
- Marketing names: Woodbine
- Origin: England

Slack-ma-Girdle is an old variety of cider apple formerly widely grown in the South-West of England. It is one of a group of similar and closely related varieties all often known by the name "Woodbine".

== Origin ==
Slack-ma-Girdle is most often found in orchards in Devon, where it probably originated, though it was also planted in southern Somerset, Dorset and elsewhere. The apple's unusual name, like that of several other cider apples, has been suggested as referring to the drink's effect on the digestive system.

== Characteristics ==
The tree itself is large when fully grown and vigorous, with a spreading habit. The fruit tends to have a flattened shape, greenish yellow skin, and a striped red flush which often has a distinctive bluish tinge. Like many other Devon varieties, it is classed as a "sweet" type in the standard classification of cider apples, being low in tannin and acid.

A very similar variety, "Woodbine" or "Rice's Jersey", is sometimes described as synonymous with Slack-ma-Girdle, but the former can be distinguished by the tree's less compact habit: both varieties produce a cider with a distinctive woody aftertaste. Hogg was not impressed with Slack-ma-Girdle's vintage qualities, stating that it had "not much merit" as a cider apple. It was also used for culinary purposes, and was reputed to make good jam.
