= Cap of Liberty (apple) =

Apple cultivar

'Cap of Liberty'
- Species: Malus domestica
- Origin: England

Cap of Liberty, also known by the name Red Soldiers or Bloody Soldier, is a traditional cider apple cultivar originating in the Martock area of central Somerset.

== Characteristics ==
The cultivar makes a medium-sized tree with a distinctive habit, having several long, unbranching, spreading limbs. It bears in mid season.

The small fruit have a strong red flush on a yellow ground, a shape between conical and cylindrical and are of full 'bittersharp' type, being high in tannin and malic acid levels. 'Cap of Liberty' is similar to and may be related to other central Somerset varieties such as Lambrook Pippin. It is considered to be of 'vintage' quality, i.e. capable of making single varietal cider.

The tree is extremely prone to apple scab, with some scab and consequent die-back being almost always present. It also has some susceptibility to canker. It was little planted after the 1920s and by the 1960s it was commented by Long Ashton Research Station staff that the "few remaining trees [of 'Cap of Liberty'] are old", but the variety is now available from some commercial growers.
