= Yarlington Mill =

Apple cultivar

'Yarlington Mill'
- Species: Malus domestica
- Origin: England, c.1898

Yarlington Mill is a traditional cider apple cultivar originating from the village of Yarlington, in the North Cadbury area of Somerset, England.

== Origin ==
Yarlington Mill was said to have first been discovered as a 'wilding' in 1898 by a Mr. Bartlett, who found it growing out of a wall by the mill-race at Yarlington. It was subsequently propagated and popularised by the grower Harry Masters, who also raised the cultivar known as 'Harry Masters' Jersey'. It was first widely planted in Somerset and subsequently in Devon and other West Country cider producing areas.

== Characteristics ==
The tree is high yielding, and was included in many 20th century orchard plantings, though it has a strong tendency to biennial fruiting.

The fruit is generally small to medium, globose conical in shape, and red in colour. A typical Somerset 'Jersey' type apple, it is classed as a mild 'bittersweet' under the Long Ashton cider apple classification.
