= Chisel Jersey =

Apple cultivar

Malus domestica 'Chisel Jersey'
- Cultivar: 'Chisel Jersey'
- Origin: England, 19th century

The 'Chisel Jersey' is a cultivar of cider apple originating in Somerset.

== Etymology ==
The term "Jersey" or "Jaysey" is applied to bittersweet type cider apples in Somerset; the equivalent varietal terms in Herefordshire and Gloucestershire are "Norman" and "French" respectively.

"Chisel" may be derived from the old dialect word chesil, meaning a pebble, and refer to the apple's small, russetted appearance and hardness.

== History ==
'Chisel Jersey' is thought to have originated in the 19th century in Martock and for around a century was planted little outside the immediate area. During the mid 20th century it was more widely planted in commercial orchards in Somerset and Dorset, and can still be found despite the subsequent destruction of many older orchards.

In the Martock district 'Chisel Jersey' was believed to be one of the parents of the commercially important cultivar 'Dabinett', a belief supported by subsequent research by the Long Ashton Research Station.

== Characteristics ==
'Chisel Jersey' is a full "bittersweet" apple, high in tannins and sugars and relatively low in malic acid. The fruit are small, green with a striped red flush, and ripen late in the year: they usually have a distinctive offset stem (hence its alternative name 'Sidestalk Jersey'). In some seasons virus infection can tend to produce small, cracked, heavily russetted fruit. The fruit somewhat resembles that of the cultivar's supposed offspring 'Dabinett', albeit the latter is less tannic. The cultivar 'Sandford Jersey' was commercially planted in Herefordshire under the name 'Chisel Jersey', but can be distinguished from the true cultivar by the lack of an offset stem.

The tree is diploid and though self-sterile is an excellent pollinator.
