= Tom Putt =

Apple cultivar

'Tom Putt'
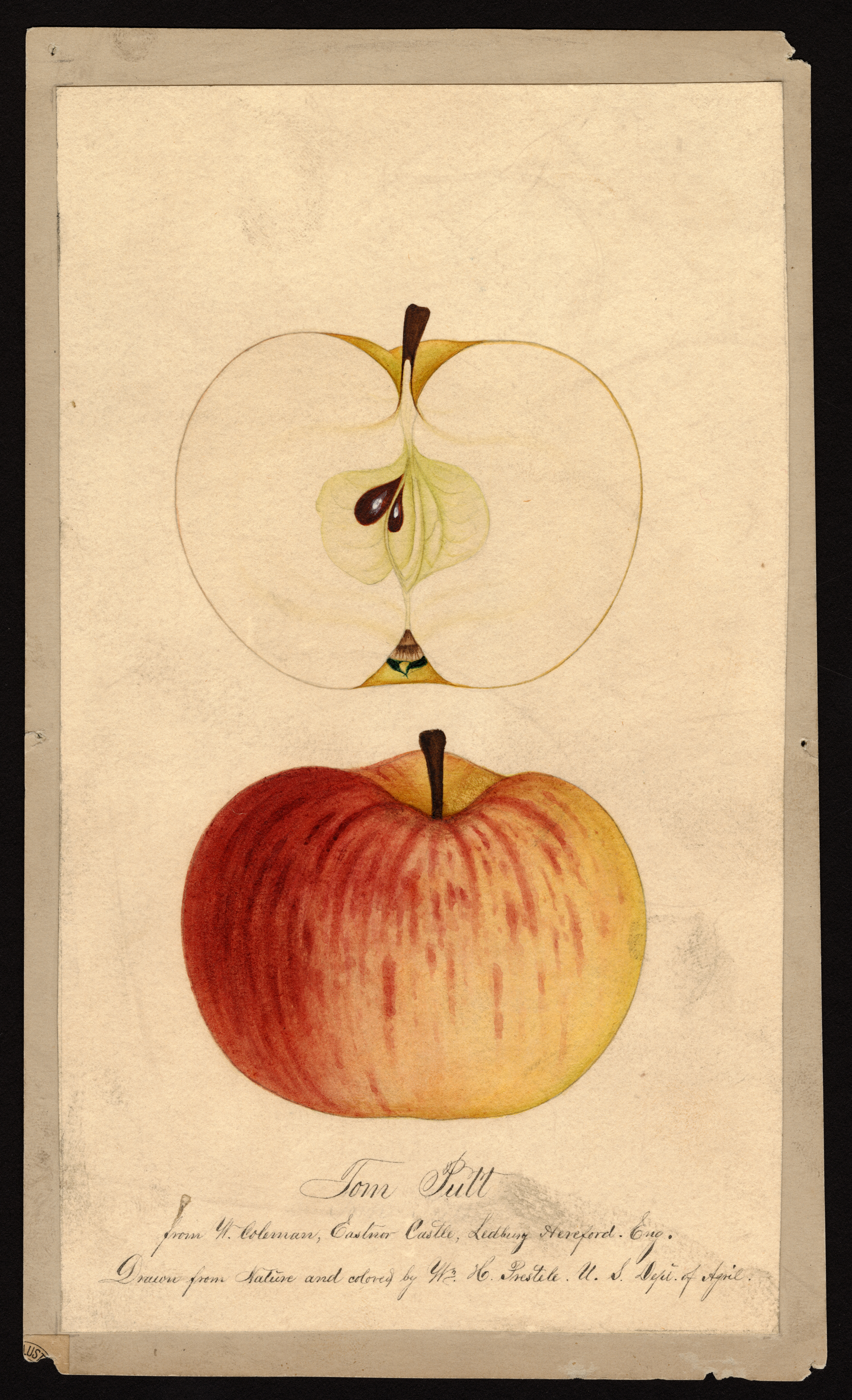
- Species: Malus domestica
- Origin: England, late 1700s.

'Tom Putt' is a traditional variety of dual purpose apple, often used as a cider apple, originating in Devon. It was also known as Ploughman, Coalbrook, Marrowbone, Thomas Jeffreys and by many other local names.

== Origin ==
The apple is associated with Combe House in Gittisham. According to correspondence sent to Devon and Cornwall Notes and Queries, the apple Tom Putt was supposed to have been named for an 18th-century landowner, Thomas Putt of Combe, who died in 1787 and was nicknamed "Black Tom". Putt, a barrister, is reputed to have perfected the variety and is also said to have won prizes for his fruit trees at agricultural fairs in Honiton. However older growers in Somerset, according to Harold Taylor in The Apples of England, told a story that the Putt commemorated by the apple was a rector, Rev. Thomas Putt of Trent, a nephew of Thomas Putt of Combe. It is possible that "Black Tom" Putt first developed the variety and subsequently gave a tree to his nephew.

== Characteristics ==
Tom Putt was grown widely across Devon and Somerset for many years, in gardens as well as orchards, leading to it being nicknamed the "Cottage Apple". Although due to this wide propagation it is now somewhat variable in form it is usually a red-streaked apple of medium size. It is an early-bearing triploid variety, classed as a "sharp" type under the usual classification of cider apples.

Although primarily a cider apple, Tom Putt can also be used as a cooking or eating apple. Taylor, who stated that it "looks attractive on the table as dessert, and has a characteristic sharp flavour of its own" noted that it was used for all three purposes in Somerset.
