= Hangdown (apple) =

Apple cultivar

'Hangdown'
- Species: Malus domestica
- Origin: England, ?18th c.

The Hangdown, also known as Hangydown, Horner, or the Pocket Apple, is a traditional variety of cider apple grown mostly in Somerset and North Devon.

== Description ==
A small to medium-sized, yellow-skinned apple of round or slightly cylindrical shape, Hangdown is most easily identified by the tree's habit, which is compact, with twiggy branches that droop heavily when in full fruit. Its origin is unknown, but it was possibly first grown in the Glastonbury area of Somerset. It was also widely grown in Devon, where it was often given the name "Pocket Apple".

In the classification of cider apples the Hangdown is referred to as a (mild) bittersweet type, and is considered to be a 'vintage' variety, i.e. capable of making single-varietal cider. It is scab-susceptible.

Although Hangdown is rarely present in modern commercial orchards, it was once one of the varieties recommended by the Long Ashton Research Station for cidermaking, and is still present in 'trial' orchards outside its native area.

There are a number of closely related varieties, such as the "Improved Hangdown", also known as "Improved Horner" or "Osier", which was sourced by Long Ashton from the Wedmore area in around 1900. Some of these varieties are likely seedlings of the original, sharing the same type of fruit and drooping habit.
