= Dabinett =

Apple cultivar

Malus domestica 'Dabinett'
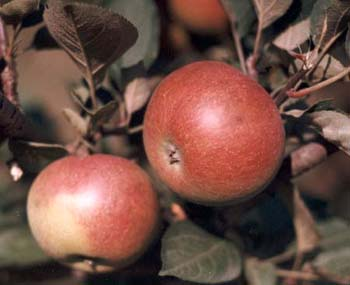
- Species: Malus domestica (apple)
- Cultivar: 'Dabinett'
- Origin: Somerset, probably early 1900s

'Dabinett' is an apple cultivar primarily used in cider production in Somerset.

== History ==
'Dabinett' probably dates from the early 1900s, when it was found by William Dabinett growing as a wilding (a natural seedling) in a hedge at Middle Lambrook, South Petherton, Somerset. The exact genetic makeup of Dabinett is unknown, though one 'parent' was probably the Chisel Jersey apple, a similar late "bittersweet" variety. The variety became very popular and was widely planted across the south-west of England.

A seedling of this variety, known as 'Black Dabinett', also locally known as 'Tommy Rodford', arose at Kingsbury Episcopi near Martock. It is similar to 'Dabinett' proper but is purplish in colour and generally more vigorous.

== Characteristics ==
Classed as a "bittersweet" cider apple, 'Dabinett' has small, yellow-green fruit flecked with red, usually harvested in November in the United Kingdom. The flesh is greenish and aromatic. The tree has a relatively small and spreading habit; it has a high resistance to apple scab and canker. Acid content 0.18%

The fruit is of sufficient quality to make a single varietal cider. Several cider manufacturers, including Thatchers and Sheppy's, use 'Dabinett' apples in their products.
