= Brown Snout =

Apple cultivar

'Brown Snout'
- Species: Malus domestica
- Origin: England, c.1850

'Brown Snout' is a 19th-century cultivar of cider apple originating in Herefordshire in the United Kingdom, though now grown in other counties and parts of the world.

== History ==
Although several different apple varieties have been given this name in the past, the familiar 'Brown Snout' cultivar of apple is said to have been discovered on the farm of a Mr Dent at Yarkhill, Herefordshire, in the middle of the 19th century. It was subsequently widely propagated by the H. P. Bulmer company of Hereford, and was planted in orchards across the west Midlands and, less commonly, in parts of the West Country. The Brown Snout remains a popular cultivar in traditional cider making.

== Characteristics ==
It is a late-flowering variety, classed as a "bittersweet" apple, with relatively high tannins and low levels of malic acid. It makes a medium-sized tree with a stiffly upright habit. The fruit are small and green, with patches of russeting, and a large patch of russeting at the calyx end, giving the variety its name.

'Brown Snout' is very susceptible to fire blight.
