= Tolman Sweet =

Apple cultivar

'Tolman Sweet'
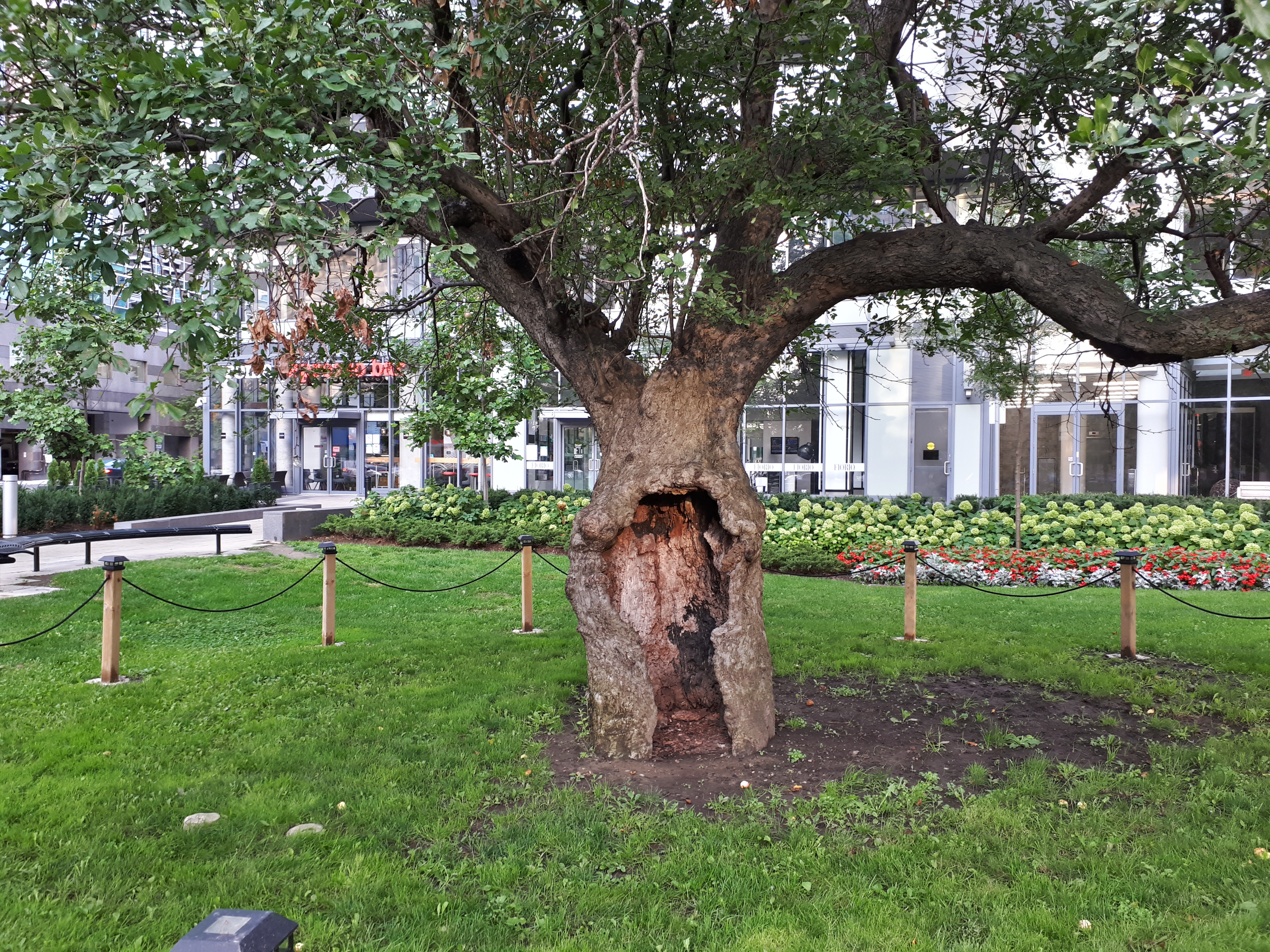
- Tree located at the Gibson House in Toronto
- Species: Malus pumila

The Tolman Sweet is a cultivar of apple with a butter yellow color, with faint russet dots and a "suture line" along one side of the fruit from top to bottom.

- Typical size: width 71–79 mm, height 59–67 mm, stalk 18–27 mm.
- Eye small, closed.
- Core heart-shaped, axile, closed.
- Flesh yellowish to white, breaking, firm, very sweet, rich, rather dry, moderately, juicy.
- Tree hardy, very productive, moderately vigorous.

== Usage and history ==
Being a small apple, it was used for boiling and pickling. A hearty tree, it was also used for a grafting stock. According to a source published in 1905, the Tolman Sweet was one of several varieties that "were being grafted into the farm orchards in the older settled parts of the state [New York State] a century or more ago".

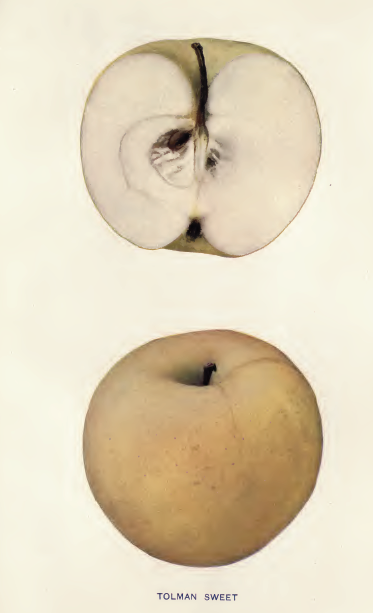
Cross section of the apple

Synonyms for the variety include: Brown's Golden Sweet, Tallman's Sweet, Tallman Sweet, Tollman Sweet, Tallman Sweeting, Tollman's Sweeting, Talman Sweet, Talman's Sweet, Talman Sweet, Talman's Sweeting, Tolman, Tolman Sweet, Tolman's Sweeting, Tolman Sweeting, Tolman's Sweeting.

From the 1905 publication: "Fruit medium or below, rather attractive for a yellow apple. It meets with little demand in the general market, but is sold to a limited extent in special markets and to special classes of trade. The fruit is generally much esteemed for certain culinary purposes as pickling, boiling and baking. Its keeping quality varies in different seasons. In ordinary storage it is in season from November to January with December as the commercial limit. In cold storage its commercial limit varies under different conditions from February to April. Some find that it stands heat well before going into storage; others report that it does not. It shows bruises very readily and requires careful handling. The fruit hangs fairly well to the tree, is quite uniform in grade and suffers comparatively little loss in drops and culls. The tree is a good grower, long-lived and very hardy. Throughout Northern New York, Northern New England, certain portions of Canada and the northern portion of the apple belt in the prairie region of the Middle West, Tolman Sweet has gained the reputation of being one of the hardiest of the old New England varieties. For this reason it is often selected as a stock upon which to top-graft less hardy kinds. The tree comes into bearing at a moderately early age, and, generally speaking, is a reliable cropper, yielding from moderate to heavy crops biennially or sometimes almost annually." The same source was unable to locate the origin of the variety, perhaps coming from Massachusetts. It was among the most popular sweet varieties in orchards in New York State at the time.
