= Cider apple =

Fruit used for making apple cider

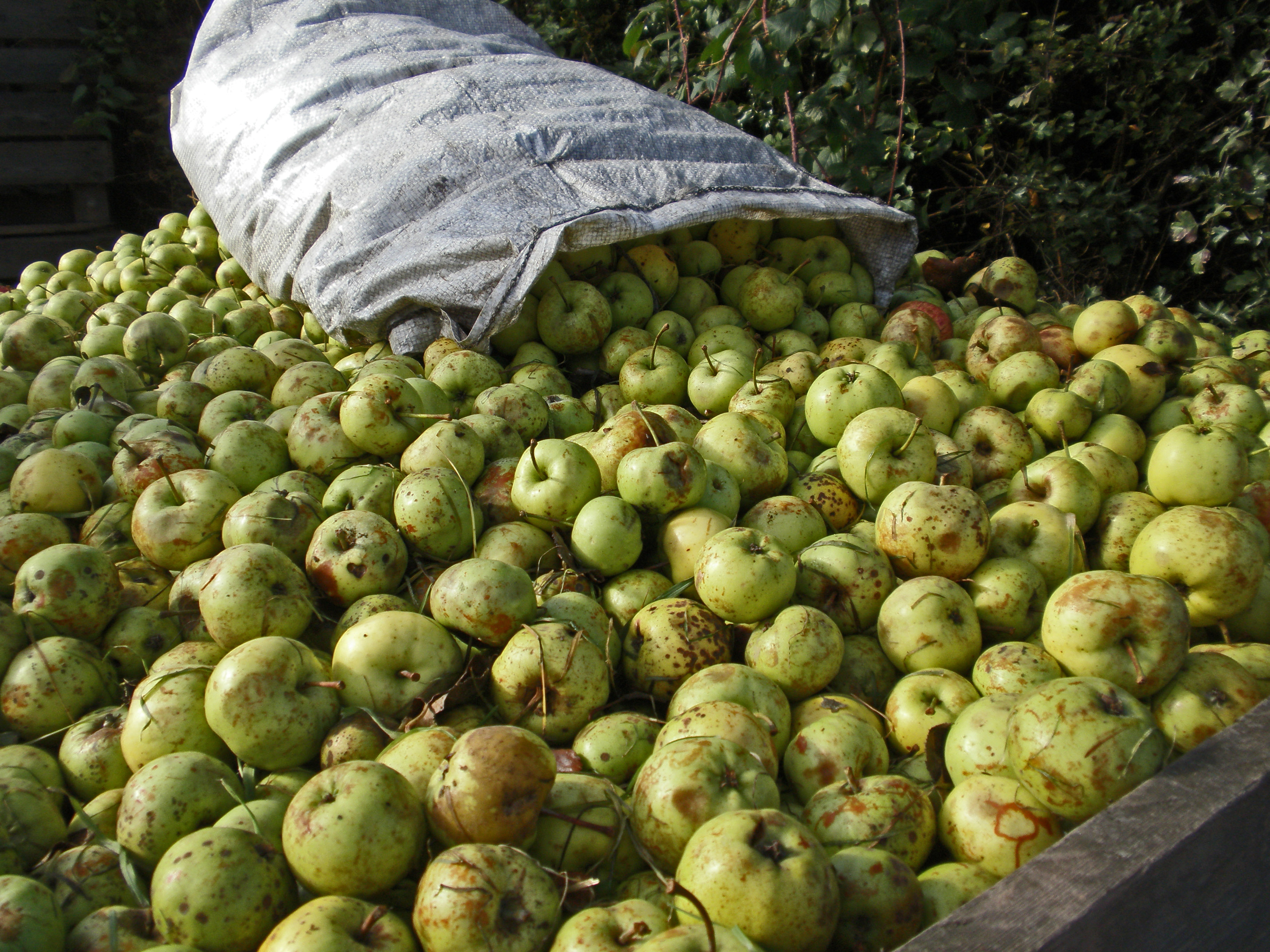
Cider apples ripening in Herefordshire

Cider apples are a group of apple cultivars grown for their use in the production of cider (referred to as "hard cider" in the United States). Cider apples are distinguished from "cookers" and "eaters", or dessert apples, by their bitterness or dryness of flavour, qualities which make the fruit unpalatable but can be useful in cidermaking. Some apples are considered to occupy more than one category.

In the United Kingdom, the Long Ashton Research Station categorised cider apples in 1903 into four main types according to the proportion of tannins and malic acid in the fruit. For cider production, it is important that the fruit contains high sugar levels which encourage fermentation and raise the final alcohol levels. Cider apples therefore often have higher sugar levels than dessert and cooking apples. It is also considered important for cider apples to contribute tannins, which add depth to the finished cider's flavour.

== Classification of cider apples ==
=== Long Ashton Research Station classification system ===
In 1903, Professor B.T.P. Barker, the first director of the Long Ashton Research Station (LARS) in Bristol, England, established an analytical classification system for cider apples based on tannin and malic acid percentages in pressed juice. This system is divided into four categories, which are as follows:

Long Ashton four class system
Classification	Malic Acid (% w/v)	Tannin (% w/v)	Examples	Comments
Sweet (SW)	<0.45 (low)	<0.2 (low)	Slack-ma-Girdle, Sweet Alford, Sweet Coppin, Northwood	Sweets are defined by low acid and tannin levels. Most dessert apples are also sweets, though there is a group of cider cultivars with these characteristics.
Sharp (SH)	>0.45 (high)	<0.2 (low)	Crimson King, Tom Putt, Brown's Apple, Backwell Red	The high acidity of sharps, like that from bittersharps, can add "bite" to the cider. While there is a group of sharp cider apples, most cooking apples are also sharps, and traditional cooking varieties were often used in cidermaking in eastern England.
Bittersweet (BSW)	<0.45 (low)	>0.2 (high)	Brown Snout, Dabinett, Yarlington Mill, Chisel Jersey, Hangdown	Bittersweet cultivars are often of European origin; they were often widely supposed to have originated in northwestern France, and bittersweet cultivars were often referred to by the terms "French" and "Norman" in the cider-producing counties of Gloucestershire and Herefordshire respectively. The raised levels of tannin add bitterness or astringency to the cider, a desirable quality.
Bittersharp (BSH)	>0.45 (high)	>0.2 (high)	Foxwhelp, Hewe's Crab, Kingston Black, Cap of Liberty	Having high levels of tannin and acid, bittersharps are particularly suitable for single-varietal ciders. Along with bittersweets, these have historically been known as “spitters” because they are naturally unpalatable.

Long Ashton's classification system also included a three-level classification of tannin: "full" for an apple with pronounced tannins (e.g. a "full bittersweet" such as Chisel Jersey, "mild" for light tannins such as Cummy Norman, and "medium" such as Dabinett.

Long Ashton seven class system
Classification	Malic acid %	Tannin %	Examples
Sweet	<0.45	<0.20	Sweet Alford, Woodbine
Bittersharp	>0.45	>0.20	
Mild Bittersweet	0.45	0.20-0.25	Cummy Norman, Hangdown, Perthyre, Royal Wilding.
Medium Bittersweet	<0.45	0.25-0.30	Dabinett, Dove, Yarlington Mill.
Full Bittersweet	<0.45	>0.30	Knotted Kernel, Strawberry Norman.
Medium Sharp	0.45-0.75	<0.20	Lambrook Pippin, Langworthy, Crimson King.
Full Sharp	>0.75	0.20	Cap of Liberty, Fair Maid of Devon, Frederick.

Tannins are further sometimes categorised as "hard" or "soft", for bitter and astringent tannins respectively.

British cidermakers normally blend juice from apples of multiple categories to ensure a finished cider with a balanced flavour and for the best and most consistent quality. While traditional ciders were made from whatever apples were available locally, the blend of sugar, acid and tannin required for a successful cider is difficult to achieve from any single cultivar with the possible exception of some bittersharps. As bittersharps are rare, a common modern approach is to use a range of bittersweet varieties with some sharps, or a cooking apple such as the readily available Bramley, to balance the acidity. Sharps, with their high acid content, also keep the cider's pH below 3.8 to prevent spoilage; sweets help provide adequate sugar for fermentation to the proper alcohol content.

=== French and Spanish classification systems ===
In addition to the Long Ashton Research Station classification, Charles Neal has written about a French classification system. In France and Spain, the system has an intermediate category called acidulée or acidulada respectively, which is sometimes used to classify cider apples that are semi-tart and have low tannin content. Similar to the English system, acidity and tannins are considered. Apples are classified as follows:

French classification system
Classification	Malic Acid (% w/v)	Tannin (% w/v)	Examples
Douce	0 - 0.40	<0.2 (low)	Doux Normandie, Rouge Duret
Amere	0 - 0.40	>0.3 (high)	Cidor, Domaines
Douce Amere	0 - 0.40	0.20 - 0.30 (medium)	Bedan, Saint Martin
Acidule	0.40 - 0.60	<0.20 (low)	Judeline, Blanchet
Aigre Amere	>0.60	> 0.3 (high)	Cazo Jaune
Aigre	>0.60	<0.2 (low)	Avrolles, Judaine

Spanish classification system
Classification	Malic acid %	Tannin %	Examples
Acido	> 0.65	< 0.145	Blanquina, Teórica
Amargo	< 0.45	> 0.2	Clara
Dulce	< 0.45	< 0.145	Pepa, No Prieta Antigua, Coloradona
Dulce-Amargo	< 0.45	0.145 - 0.2	Obdulina
Acido-Amarga	> 0.65	0.145 - 0.2	Meana
Acidulado o Semiacido	0.45 - 0.65	< 0.145	Dolores, Campillo

In the US, there are four regions where cider apples are grown in orchards: the Northeast, Mid-Atlantic, Midwest, and Northwest. Out of the twenty most commonly grown cider apple varieties, half originate from England, two come from France, and the rest originate in America. Most special cider cultivars for European ciders are bittersweets and bittersharps, which have high tannin content. There are not a lot of cultivars with high tannins readily available in the U.S. Most ciders in the United States are made from culled dessert apples that are generally sweets and sharps. There is no systematic classification of North American apple cultivars for cider-making purposes. However, there is a database for apple varieties called the U.S. National Plant Germplasm System (NPGS).

=== Other classification considerations ===
Beyond the Long Ashton or English system and French system for classifying cider apples, there are other considerations for characterisation. Other measurements taken of apple varieties towards use in cider classification include pH, polyphenol composition, yeast assimilable nitrogen (YAN), and soluble solid concentration (ºBrix). The sharpness of an apple is affected by pH and titratable acidity. Most cultivars must reach pH levels of around 3.3 to 3.8 to aid in the fermentation process, and additions of malic acid may be necessary if the cider apple is over this desired threshold. Soluble solids as measured in units of degrees Brix can be used to quantify the potential alcohol that a yeast can ferment from the initial juice of the cider apple. This is carefully considered in cultivars from areas where there are tax regulations on the percentage of alcohol by volume that is contained in these products. In the United States, "hard cider" legally falls between the 0.5% to 8.5% alcohol by volume tax bracket. Cideries that exceed a soluble solids level of 17 °Brix will be subject to higher tax levels that are classified under cider wine. In the United Kingdom, cider falls in two duty brackets, with a flat rate for up to 7.4% ABV, and a higher duty rate for ciders between 7.4% to 8.5% ABV. Foaming is an intricate, yet essential component that can be used to assess the overall quality of a cider and distinguish between natural and sparkling ciders. Chemically, hydrophobic polypeptides contribute to the initial foam, bubble size, the extent to which it persists, number of nucleation sites, and the froth of the foam (foam collar). These chemical compositions and parameters are quantitatively measured through metrics such as foam height, foam stability height, and stability time. The olfactory sensory profile is used to determine the specific aroma of the cider. Research is still ongoing in this field, but the aromas that contribute to the sensory perceptions of cider mainly come from the phenols 4-ethyl guaiacol and 4-ethyl phenol.

== Styles ==
Cider is made in several countries and can be made from any apples. Historically the flavours preferred and varieties used to produce cider have varied by region. Many of the most traditional apple varieties used for ciders come from or are derived from those from Devon, Somerset and Herefordshire in England, Normandy in France, and Asturias in Spain, and these areas are considered to have their own broad cider styles although the many exceptions make this more of a historic footnote. Normandy cider is usually naturally carbonated and clear: Asturian cider apple varieties are mainly 'sharps' or mild 'bittersweets', producing a mildly acidic cider which is customarily served by being poured from height into the glass to oxygenate it.

In the UK there are two broad styles of cider, determined by the types of apple available. The style associated with the east of England (East Anglia, Kent, Sussex) used surplus dessert and cooking apples and was therefore characterised by an acidic, light-bodied cider. The other style, using specific cider apple cultivars with higher tannin levels, is usually associated with the West Country, particularly Somerset, and Three Counties. Within these broad types there are also a number of more specific regional styles. The ciders of Devon were often made largely from sweets, the cultivars low in acid and tannins that typified the county's orchards. Devon cidermakers also specialised in "keeved", or "matched" cider, where fermentation was slowed to produce a naturally sweet finish, though such ciders were usually intended for the London market and a fully fermented, dry "rough" cider was preferred for home consumption. Somerset ciders, by contrast, have tended to be stronger and more tannic. Bittersweet cultivars, locally known as "Jersey" apples, were typical of Somerset, although the county's most famous apple, Kingston Black, was a mild bittersharp. The West Midland county of Gloucestershire traditionally favoured bittersharp apples, giving strong ciders with a higher bite of acidity and tannins: neighbouring Worcestershire and Herefordshire also favoured acidic cider apples, but their growers also made plantings of dual purpose apples to take advantage of markets in nearby industrial centres.

=== Single varietal cider cultivars ===
Historically ciders have been almost invariably made from blending apple varieties, and the practice of making single variety ciders is considered largely a modern approach. Only a very small number of apple varieties are considered to be capable of making a good single-variety cider. These fruit are designated as having "vintage" quality, a term first introduced by Robert Hogg in 1888, and further popularised by Barker at Long Ashton: it should be understood as referring to the cultivar's ability to produce complex and interesting flavours, rather than in the sense "vintage" is used in winemaking.

- Sweet Coppin is a sweet originating in Devon;
- Sweet Alford is another Devon sweet variety;
- Crimson King is a sharp, first grown in Somerset;
- Yarlington Mill is a bittersweet, named after the mill in Somerset where it was found;
- Dabinett is a bittersweet named after William Dabinett, and is from Middle Lambrook, South Petherton, Somerset;
- Major is an old bittersweet variety, found in orchards in South Devon and east of the Blackdown Hills in south Somerset;
- Broxwood Foxwhelp is a Herefordshire bittersharp, probably a sport of the old variety Foxwhelp
- Kingston Black is a bittersharp probably named after the village of Kingston, near Taunton, Somerset;
- Stoke Red is a bittersharp originating from the village of Rodney Stoke in Somerset

Although considered suitable for single-variety ciders, they can also contribute well to blends.

== Cider apple composition ==
=== Polyphenols and tannins ===
Polyphenols are an important component of ciders, contributing astringency, bitterness, colloidal stability and colour. The content in apples varies depending on cultivar, production practices, and part of the fruit, with the peel of an apple having more polyphenols than the flesh. The primary polyphenol in apples is procyanidins, followed by hydroxycinnamic acids in the flesh and flavonols in peel. Much of the polyphenols in the fruit are not pressed into the juice, because they bind to polysaccharides in the fruit cell wall, becoming bound to the pomace, when the cell wall is ruptured during the pressing process. Procyanidins are especially prone to binding to the pomace with about 30% extracted into the juice. Cider apples can have five times the total phenolic content compared to dessert apples, but there is a limited supply of bittersweet and bittersharp apples in the U.S. to meet the needs of the fast-growing cider industry. Some cider makers add exogenous tannins to improve phenolic characteristics, and researchers are working on improving polyphenol extraction technology. In countries with more well-established cider industries, such as the U.K. and France, there is an adequate supply of high tannin cider apples. About one half of the apples processed for cider in Europe are bittersweet fruit.

== Orchard design ==
=== Traditional orchard design ===
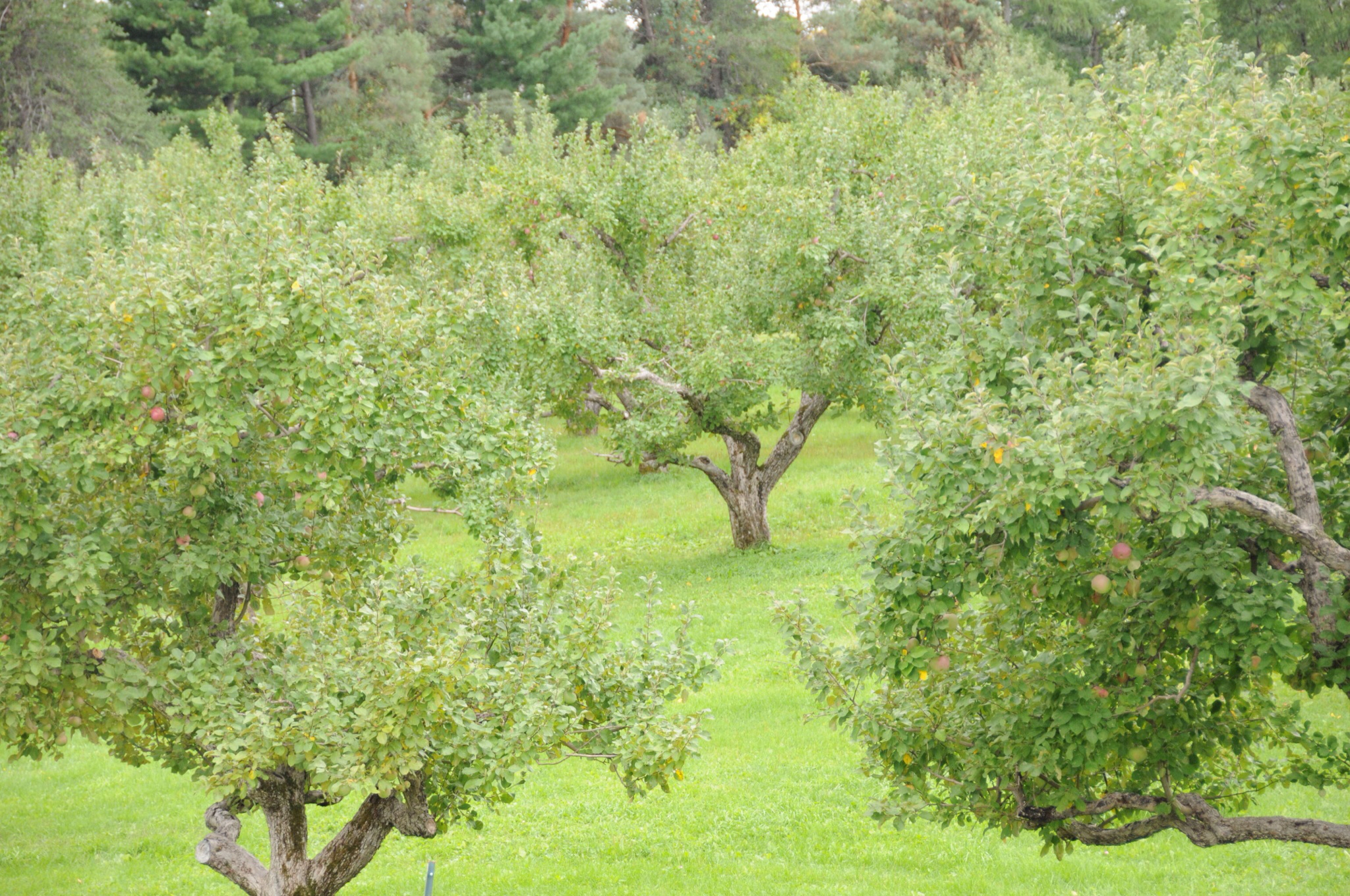
Old growth apple orchard in Ottawa, Canada

The end of the 1950s saw a huge turn in cider apple orchard design, where before traditional styles of orchard had been maintained for centuries. Traditional orchards are now uncommon, though they can still be found in places like Spain where most growers have maintained traditional systems. Traditional orchards were designed with large spacing between individual large trees;(6–12 meters tall and spaced about 7.6–9 meters apart) typically, less than 150 trees per hectare. Trees within an orchard were more variable in age; individual trees would be grown until they died and a new tree would be planted in its place. Older trees in traditional orchards can grow gnarled and hollowed for the tree's entire lifespan. The large (7.6 meter) spherical-shaped canopies of traditional methods differ from various planting systems that use conic, flat planar or v-shaped styles.

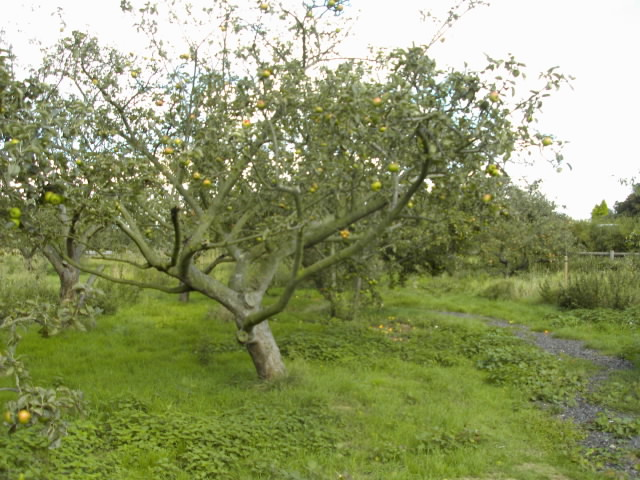
Traditional apple orchard in Eastwood, Essex

Traditional orchards were often intercropped: it was particularly common to use a silvopastoral system that combined fruit trees and pasture. The natural grasses forming the orchard's undergrowth were often grazed by sheep or cows: the English "grass orchard" was particularly associated with cider producing districts. Management techniques did not use fertiliser or chemicals, other than the natural fertilisation from the dung of grazing cattle, and generally required less training than modern, high-density systems. Budding of scions took place high up in the tree, typically using vigorous rootstocks or seedlings. Traditional orchards have been found to produce apples with lower nitrogen content and higher polyphenolic levels.

In recent years, there has been a decline in the numbers of traditional cider orchards and a corresponding loss of orchard design knowledge between generations of apple growers. Traditional orchards have, for example decreased by about 20% since 1994 in parts of Germany. The decline is partly attributed to the high maintenance demands of large trees and the physical limitations for apple pickers, the low yield (10-12 tons per hectare,) the slow cropping of trees (15 years compared to the average 8 years of high-density orchards,) and historical changes in regional alcohol preferences. During the 1950s, France subsidised growers who converted to high-density orchards. By the 1990s, most of France no longer used traditional orchard styles. By the 1970s, traditional style orchards were only used for making 25% of the cider in the United Kingdom.

=== Bush orchards ===
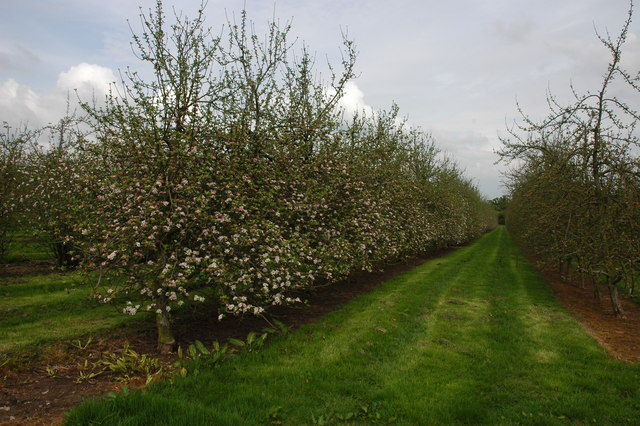
A bush orchard near Cowleigh, United Kingdom.

In response to the rising demand for cider apples in the United Kingdom in the 1950s, the Long Ashton Research Station developed the bush orchard system commonly used in the UK today. Cider apple varieties are grafted onto semi-dwarfing rootstocks and reach a maximum height of 15 to 20 feet (4.5 to 6 m). Trees are planted at a density of approximately 750 per hectare, with trees spaced 2 – 3 m (6.5–10 ft) apart in rows 5.5 m (18 ft) wide. Although more densely planted than a traditional orchard, rows are still wide enough for tractors, harvesters, and other machinery to access the rows. Unlike a high density orchard, trees are free standing and are not supported by a trellis. Bush orchards can yield 2-3 times as much as a traditional orchard, up to 35-50 tons per hectare. The bush orchard style became especially popular in the 1970s after the H.P. Bulmer and Taunton Cider companies established Incentive Planting Schemes, which rewarded farmers for planting bush orchards of cider apple varieties. Today, approximately two thirds of cider apples in the United Kingdom are grown in bush orchards.

=== High density orchards ===
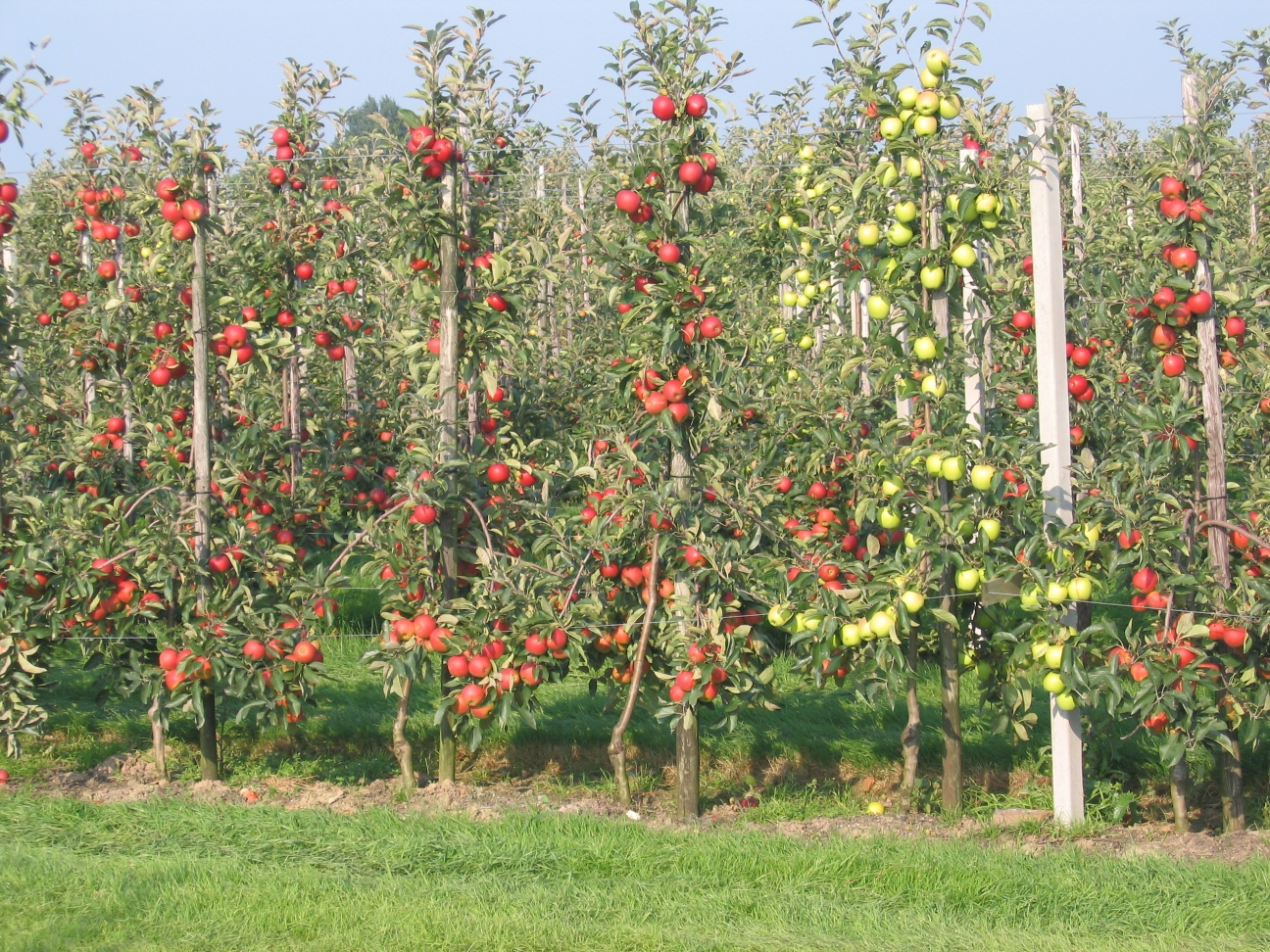
Apple trees in a modern high-density orchard.

High density planting became popular in the 1960s and 1970s, and is a common method of growing cider apples outside of the United Kingdom. The average high density orchard contains about 1,000 trees per acre, although some orchards in Europe and the Pacific Northwest may contain up to 9,000 trees per acre. Trees in high density orchards are grafted onto a precocious dwarfing rootstock that keeps the tree small and encourages early fruit production, with trees often bearing within two to three years of planting. This allows growers to bring new varieties of apple to market more quickly than they could with traditional, more widely spaced orchard designs that are slower to mature. Because trees grown on a dwarfing rootstock are small and thin, they must be supported by a trellis system. Rows are spaced depending on the height of the mature tree, usually half the tree height plus three feet (approximately 1m). High density orchards are more labor efficient than traditional orchards, as workers do not need to climb ladders during maintenance or harvest Pesticide application is also more efficient, as chemicals can be applied by over-the-row sprayers, fixed in-canopy systems, or other devices that reduce pesticide waste.

=== Tree types and planting systems ===
With the move to higher density plantings, different tree types and planting systems have been developed, and are used around the world. These systems include:

Central leader trees are commonly grown in a conical shape, with a central vertical shoot (the central leader), and horizontal larger branches at the bottom decreasing to smaller branches near the top. Central leader trees grown with standard or semi dwarf rootstocks are large and free standing, unlike modern high density plantings. The central leader system has been adjusted in recent years to suit the requirements of modern orchard designs and high density plantings.

An example of this is slender spindle. While there are different forms, slender spindle trees have the same tapered design. Top branches are regularly renewed by pruning, or weakened by bending. A less vigorous rootstock is used to limit growth, creating a smaller tree, usually individually staked for support of heavy cropping.

Solaxe and vertical axis systems are similar to both central leader and slender spindle, and has been used as a transition from low density plantings to high density plantings. Tree size is determined by rootstock, ranging from semi dwarf to fully dwarf. The trees require a form of support. These systems aim to create an equilibrium between fruiting and vegetative growth, receiving minimal pruning. Solaxe uses limb bending to control vigour, a modification from vertical axis which uses periodical pruning.

Super spindle orchard design utilises high density planting, with up to or over 2000 trees/acre. The benefits of high density include high early yields with reduced inputs such as labour due to reduced manual work and the ability to have high output picking during harvest. High density plantings are grown with a trellis system for tree support.

Tall spindle shares many of the high density benefits as super spindle, and is a combination of slender spindle, vertical axis, solaxe and super spindle systems. It utilises high density planting on dwarfing rootstocks with a range between 2,500 and 3,300 trees/acre. Tall spindle systems utilise minimal pruning at planting, and uses branch bending to control growth, and limb pruning to renew branches as they become too large. As tree height exceeds 90% of the row spacing, fruit quality at the lower parts of the tree may be reduced.

== See also ==
- Cider
- List of cider brands
- List of cideries in the United States
