= Duchess of Oldenburg (apple) =

Apple cultivar

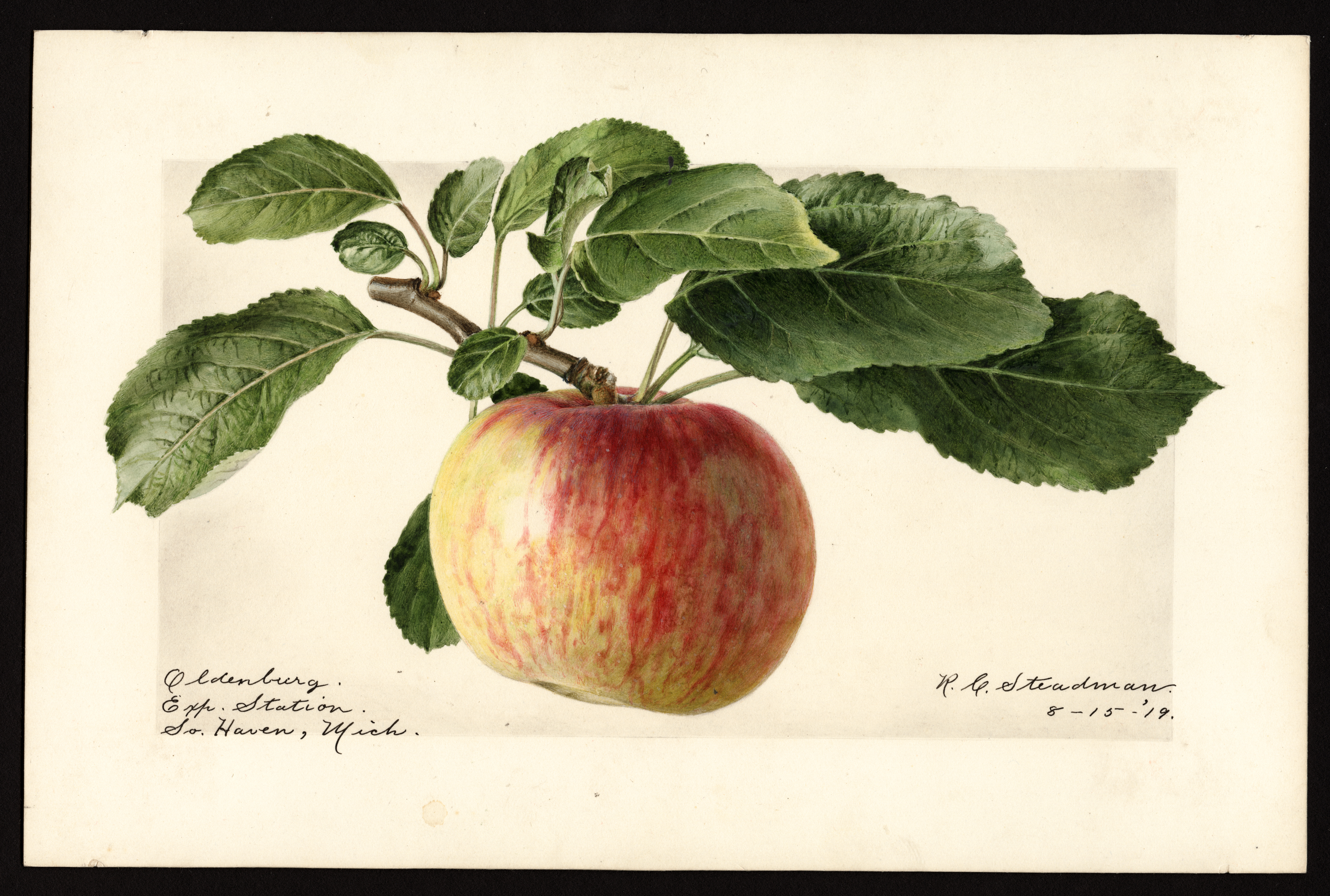
- Genus: Malus
- Species: M. domestica
- Cultivar: 'Duchess of Oldenburg'
- Origin: Russia, (1750 - 1799)

'Duchess of Oldenburg' is an old Russian cultivar (1750–1799) of cultivated apple which has attractive streaks of yellow and red. It was commonly but not universally known in America simply as 'Oldenburg' after the American Pomological Society listed that as the official name, a name also used for the 'Geheimrat Dr. Oldenburg' cultivar. The skin of the apple is more prominently striped than that of 'Geheimrat Dr. Oldenburg'.

Duchess originates in the Tula area of Russia, from where it spread to many countries under different names, like: Duchess, Duchesse, Duchesse d'Oldenburg, Oldenburg, Borowitsky, Brunswick, New Brunswick, Charlamowsky, Early Joe and Queen Mary. It was once so popular that it was used as reference in evaluation of other apple cultivars. It is widely cultivated in Europe and in the United States and is a parent of cultivars including 'Alkmene', 'Northern Spy' and 'Pinova'.

Duchess has a generally good resistance to major apple diseases, good vigour, flowers early-mid season, blossoms are self-sterile, gives an early harvest and good crop of variable size of apples, which are used for fresh eating as well as for cooking. Fruit melts in cooking, resulting in a good purée which has an orange tint.

This apple is easy to cultivate but fruits do not keep fresh very long.
