= Devonshire Quarrenden =

Apple cultivar

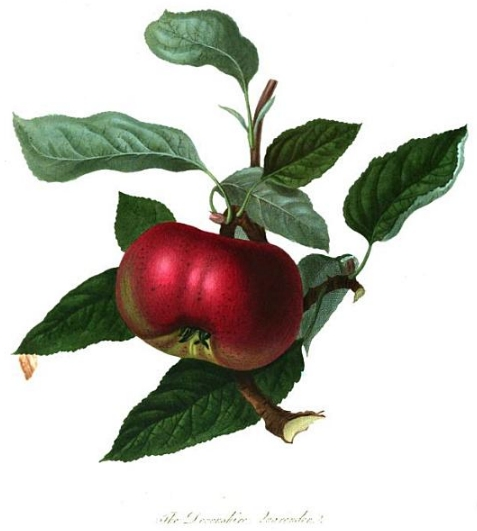
- Devonshire Quarrenden, from Hooker's Pomona Londoniensis
- Genus: Malus
- Species: domestica
- Origin: unknown, bef. 1676

The Devonshire Quarrenden is a dessert apple cultivar historically grown and probably originating in England, although it has also been suggested as originating in France. A variety of local names and spellings, including "Red Quarrenden", "Quarrington", "Quarender", and the "Sack Apple", have been recorded in the past.

== History ==
The variety has usually been assumed to be very old, though the pomologist Robert Hogg was unable to find any references to it prior to 1693, or to locate it in nurserymens' catalogues before 1790. A slightly earlier reference has however been found in John Worlidge's Vinetum Britannicum, first published in 1676. There are a small number of 15th century references to a "queryndoun", which may refer to a type of apple or pear.

It was long associated with Devon, where it was particularly common, although it has been proposed that its name is a corruption of Carentan in Normandy and that it may have originated there. Ernest Weekley suggested that the name may have derived from Carentan or from Quarrendon, a Buckinghamshire placename; the latter was also suggested by Eilert Ekwall.

Although locally in cultivation for many years in the West of England, it did not become more widely known until the 19th century, probably after it was introduced to the Fulham Nursery and Botanic Garden in about 1800. It subsequently became popular for market and was widely grown for commercial purposes up until the 1890s.

== Characteristics ==
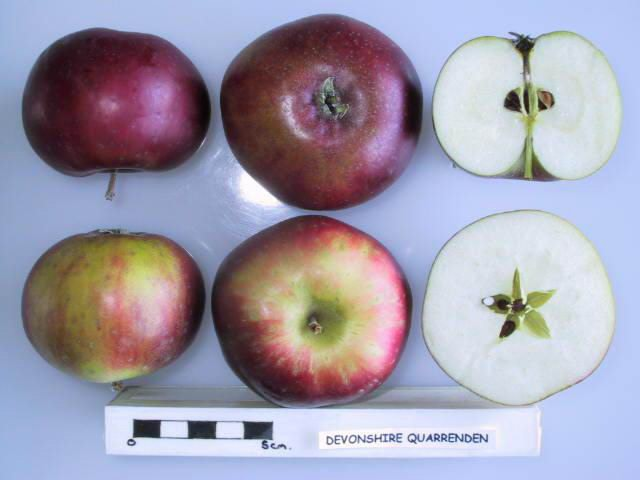
Cross section of fruit of Devonshire Quarenden, from specimen in the National Fruit Collection

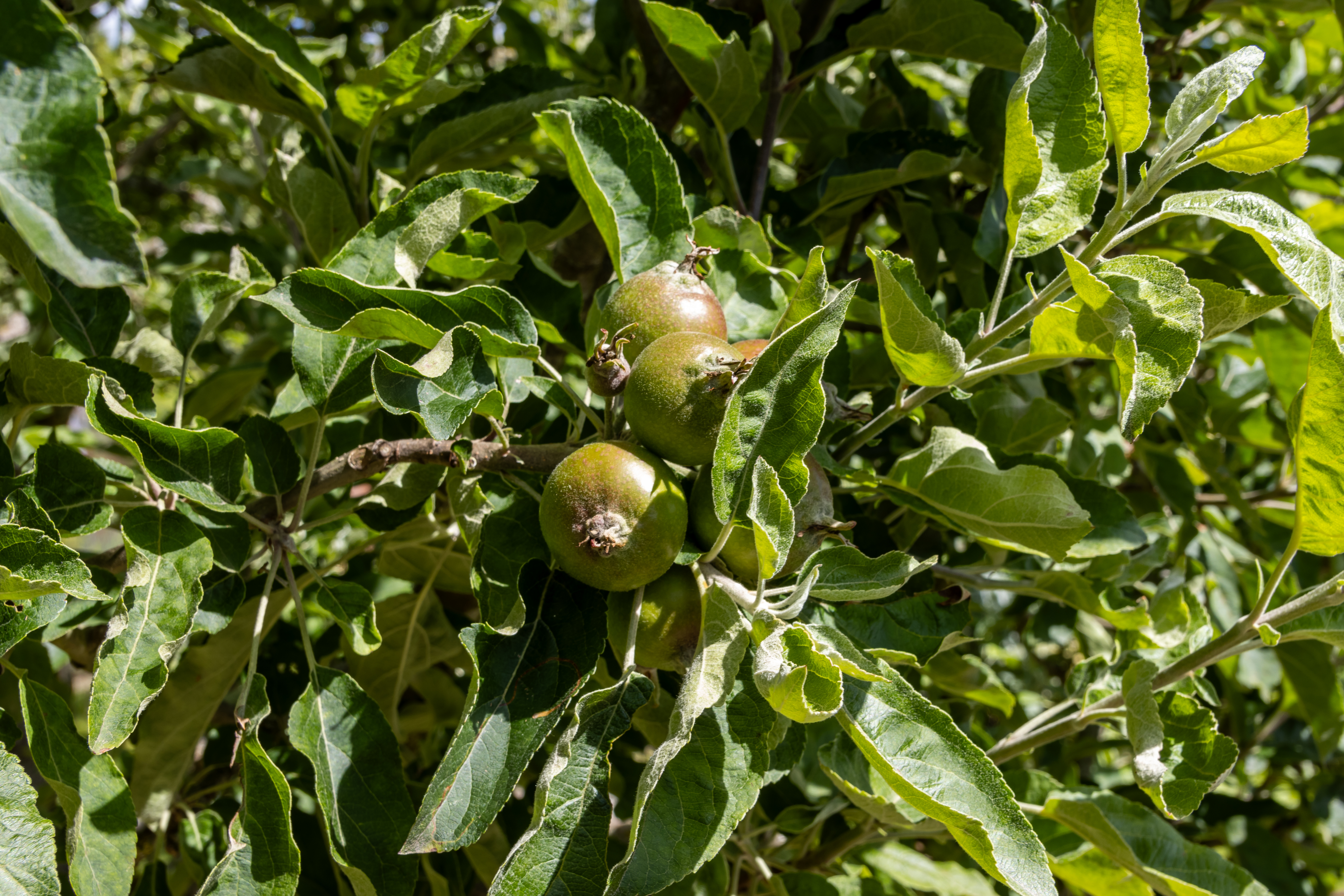
Devonshire Quarrenden growing at Hughenden Manor

As a tree, Devonshire Quarrenden has a vigorous habit, although tends to be susceptible to apple scab. It is particularly hardy and was known to thrive even in windy and damp conditions: Hogg noted he had seen it bearing well "from Devonshire to the Moray Firth". Another 19th century orchardist said it was "adapted for any situation [...] either as an orchard, standard, pyramid, bush, or trained as an espalier, or on a north, east, west, or south wall". An early bearer, it was the parent of another important early variety, Worcester Pearmain. It is sometimes said to be the origin of a noticeable strawberry flavour more clearly seen in the fruit of its descendants such as Worcester Pearmain, Discovery and Katy.

The fruit of Devonshire Quarrenden is of small to medium size, up to c. 64x48mm; skin greenish yellow, completely or almost completely covered with a bright crimson flush, and flesh greenish white. The stalk is of medium size and slender. Picking late August for use late August to early September.
