= Pinova =

Apple cultivar

Malus pumila 'Pinova'
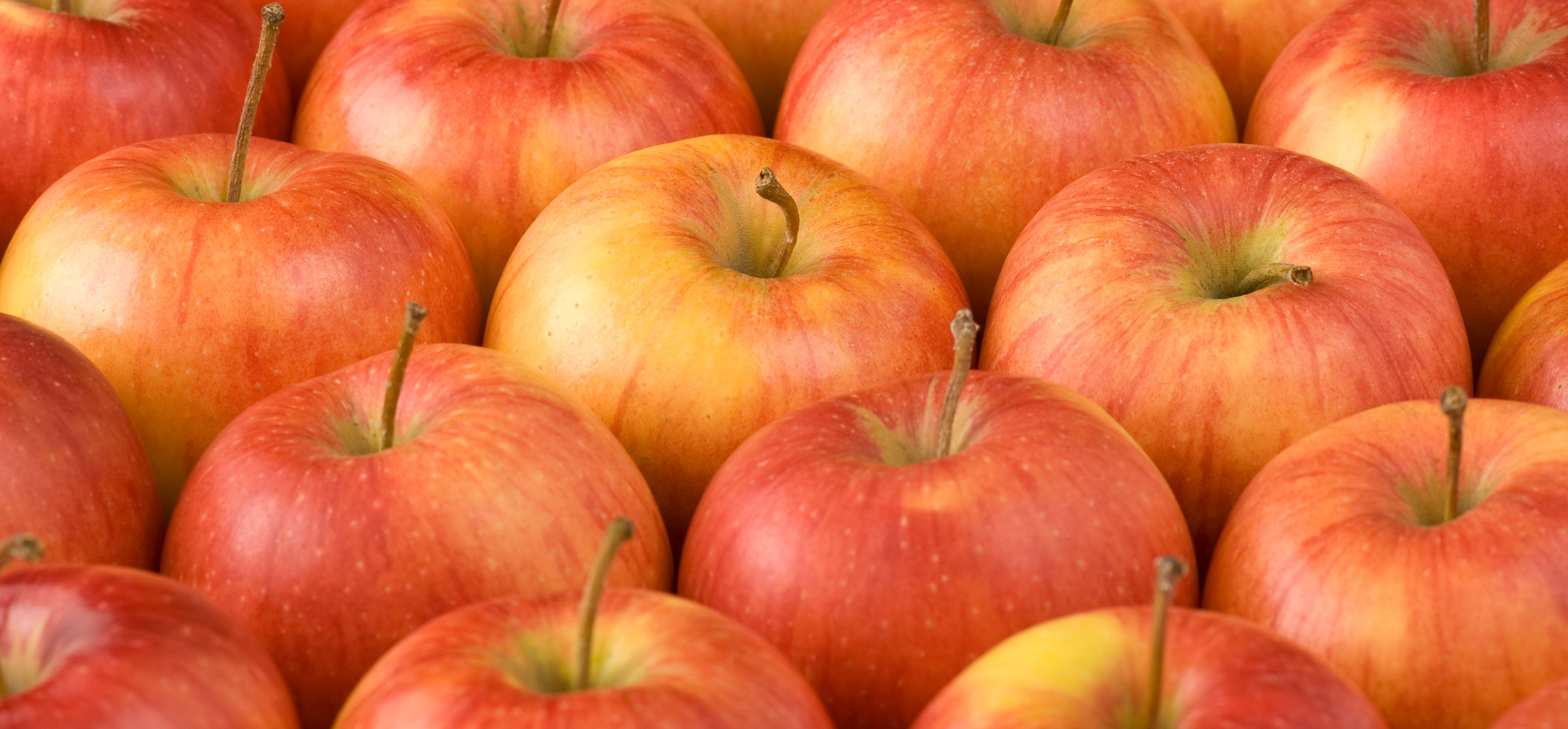
- Genus: Malus
- Species: Malus pumila
- Hybrid parentage: 'Clivia' × 'Golden Delicious'
- Cultivar: 'Pinova'
- Marketing names: Corail; Piñata; Sonata
- Origin: Pillnitz, Dresden, Germany

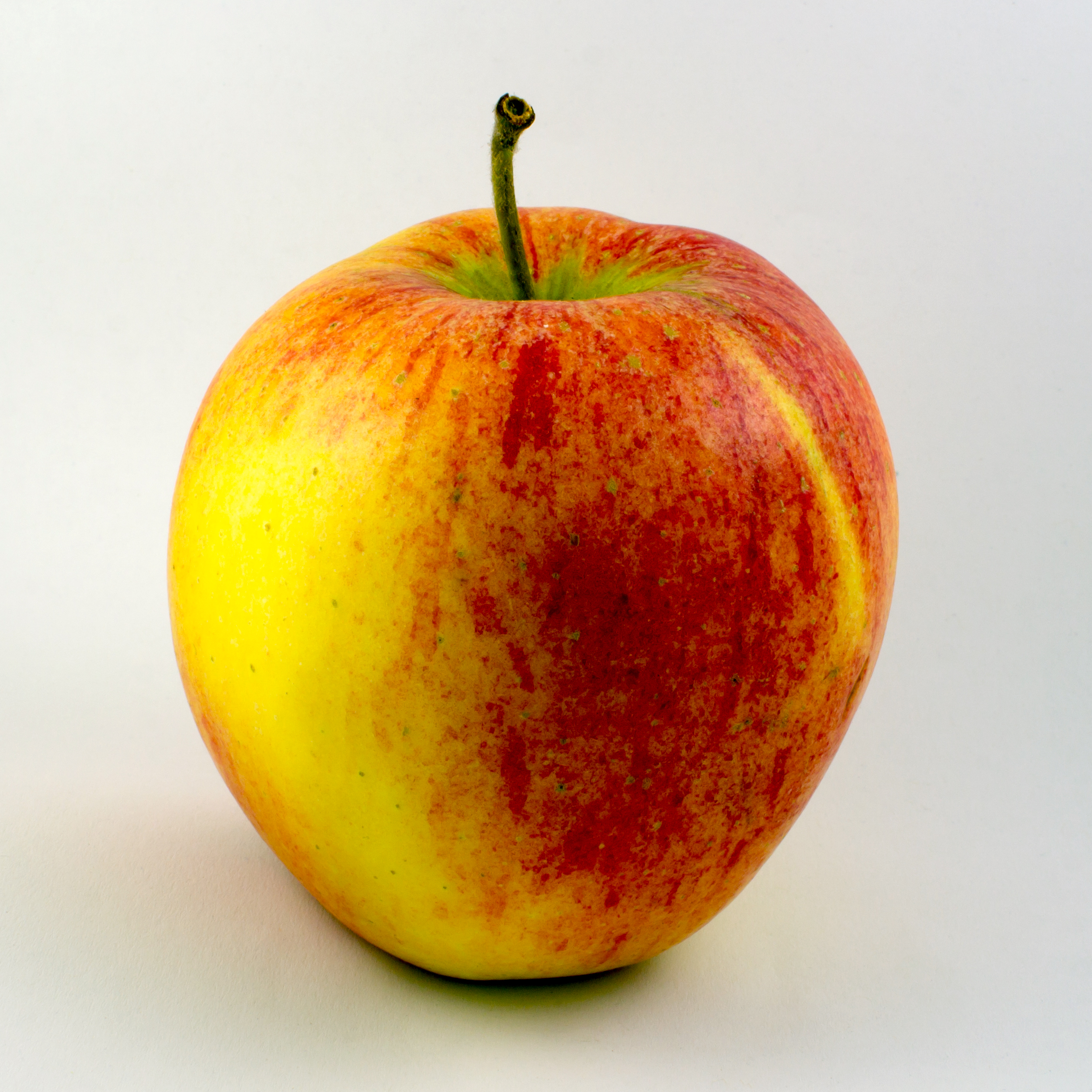
'Pinova' apple

'Pinova' is a German apple cultivar. It was created in 1965 at the Institut für Obstforschung of Dresden–Pillnitz in Saxony which at that time was in the German Democratic Republic. After Germany was re-united in 1990, the rights to the cultivar passed to the Free State of Saxony.

'Pinova' is a hybrid between 'Clivia' and 'Golden Delicious'. 'Clivia' is a hybrid of 'Geheimrat Dr. Oldenburg' and 'Cox's Orange Pippin'. 'Pinova' may also be called 'Corail', Piñata® or 'Sonata'.

== Characteristics ==
'Pinova' has a high fruit yield, with little tendency towards biennial bearing; it has good resistance to scab and is a good pollenizer for many varieties. The fruit stores well. It is juicy and crisp, and has some of the taste of Cox's, the coloration of Oldenburg and the shape of 'Golden Delicious'. The fruit is picked early in October.

'Pinova' is planted commercially in Europe. In the United States it is patented, and may be sold under the brand-name "Piñata".
