= Winston (apple) =

Apple cultivar

Malus pumila 'Winston'
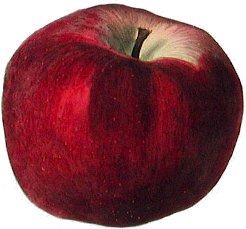
- Genus: Malus
- Species: Malus pumila
- Hybrid parentage: 'Cox's Orange Pippin' x 'Worcester Pearmain'
- Cultivar: 'Winston'
- Origin: United Kingdom

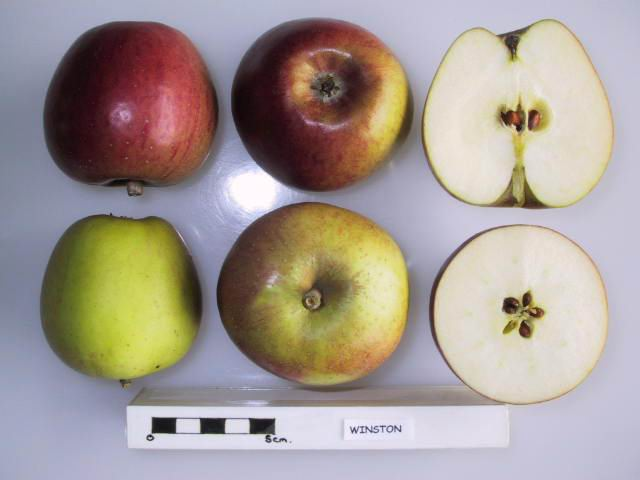
Winston

Winston is an English cultivar of domesticated apple which was first named Winter King because of its availability in the winter, but was renamed as Winston in 1944 or in 1945, after Winston Churchill.

It was developed in Berkshire, England, United Kingdom, by crossing the Cox's Orange Pippin with a Worcester Pearmain to get the optimum positive traits from both parents. This was actually what happened. It received the high eating qualities for which the Cox's is notable: a firm white flesh which is also juicy, a little sharp in taste, but well balanced with sweetness and aroma. From the Worcester it took the best part of its horticultural adventures: easy to grow, reliable crop and resistant to many diseases.

In appearance, it is usually conical in shape, medium-sized, a greenish background flushed with much bold red. It is very good in storage; harvested in December it will keep to April, and even improves its taste somewhat by keeping for some time after picking. It is one of the few apple cultivars that are self-fertile, meaning that it can set fruits with its own pollen, and doesn't necessarily need outcross pollination.

It has earned the Award of Garden Merit by the Royal Horticultural Society in 1993. Pick in England mid-October. Use December - April.
