= Katy (apple) =

Apple cultivar

Malus domestica 'Katy'
- Hybrid parentage: James Grieve and Worcester Pearmain
- Origin: Sweden 1947

Katy apple is a Swedish variety raised in 1947 at Balsgard Fruit Breeding Institute, Sweden. Parentage is James Grieve and Worcester Pearmain and it produces heavy crops of bright red fruit. Sugar 12%, acid 8.5 g/litre, vitamin C 6 mg/100g.
