= Cox's Orange Pippin =

Apple cultivar

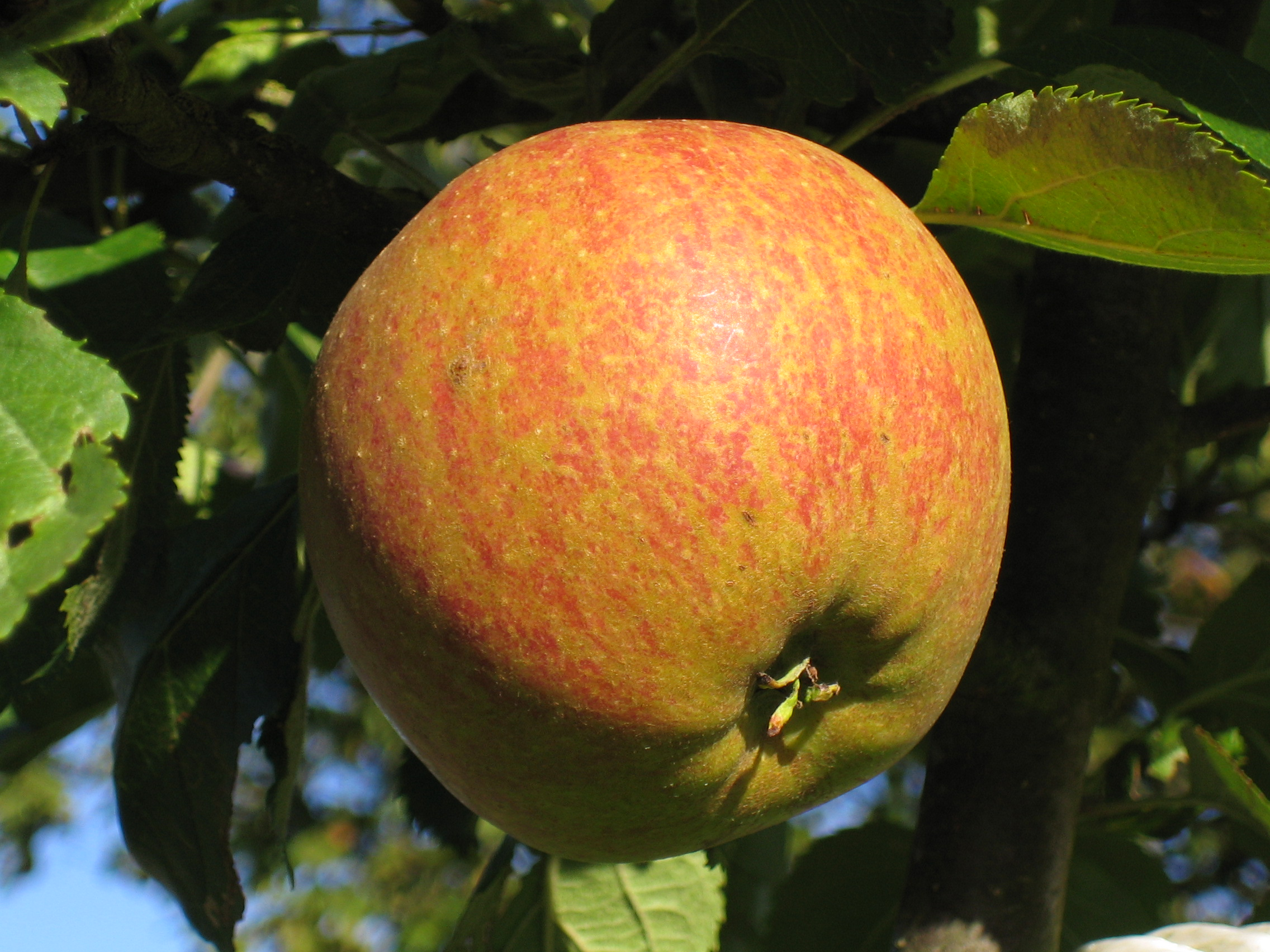
- Genus: Malus
- Species: Malus domestica
- Hybrid parentage: Margil × Rosemary Russet
- Cultivar: Cox's Orange Pippin
- Origin: (United Kingdom) Colnbrook, Buckinghamshire, 1830

Cox's Orange Pippin, in Britain often referred to simply as Cox or Cox's Pippins, is an apple cultivar first grown in 1825 or 1830 at Colnbrook in Buckinghamshire, England, by the retired brewer and horticulturist Richard Cox.

Though the parentage of the cultivar is unknown, Ribston Pippin seems a likely candidate. DNA analysis of major apple pedigrees has suggested Margil as the parent of Cox, with Ribston Pippin being another Margil seedling. The variety was introduced for sale by the 1850s by Charles Turner, and grown commercially from the 1860s, particularly in the Vale of Evesham in Worcestershire, and later in Kent.

== Description and uses ==
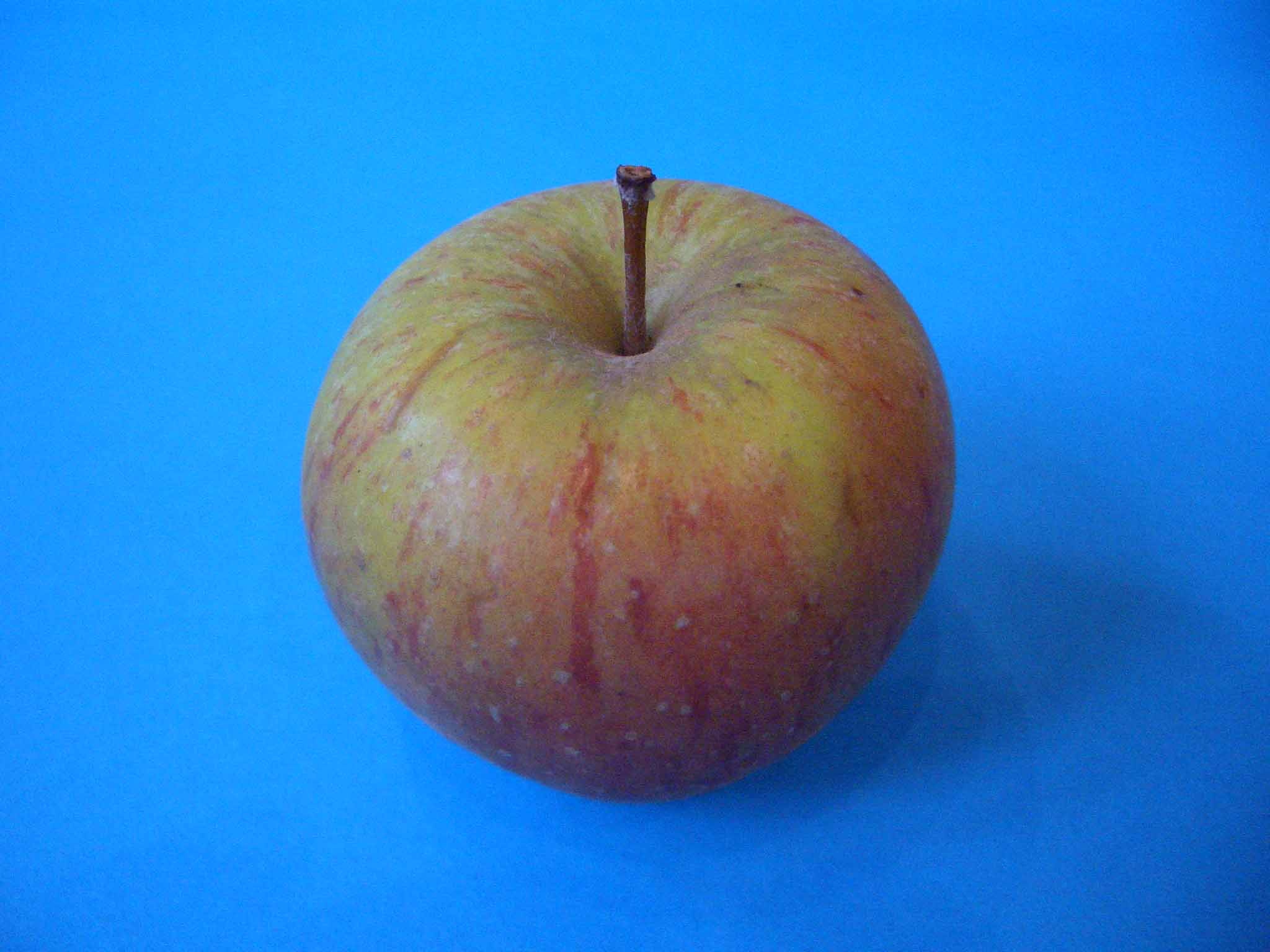
Fruit seen from stem end

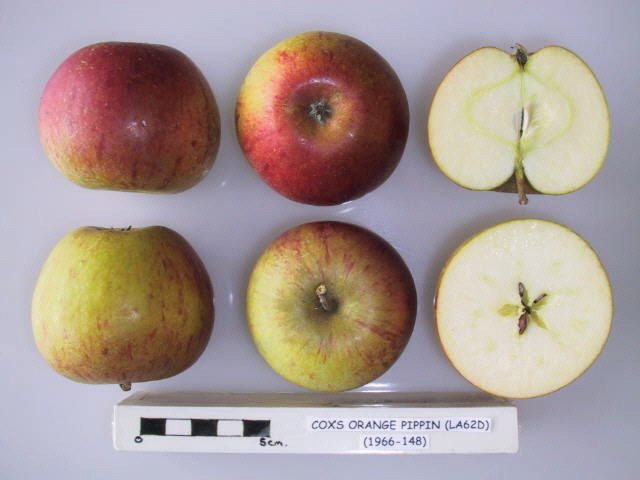
Cox Orange Pippin

'Cox's Orange Pippin' is highly regarded for its excellent flavour and attractive appearance. The apples are of medium size, orange-red in colour, deepening to bright red and mottled with carmine over a deep yellow background. The flesh is very aromatic, yellow-white, fine-grained, crisp, and very juicy. Cox's flavour is sprightly subacid, with hints of cherry and anise, becoming softer and milder with age. When ripe apples are shaken, the seeds make a rattling sound as they are only loosely held in the apple's flesh.

Cox's Orange Pippin is often blended with other varieties in the production of cider and is also used to produce high-quality apple juice, particularly in artisanal or premium cold-pressed forms.

- S genotype S5 S9.
- Vitamin C 10 mg/100 gram
- Density 0.85

== Cultivation ==
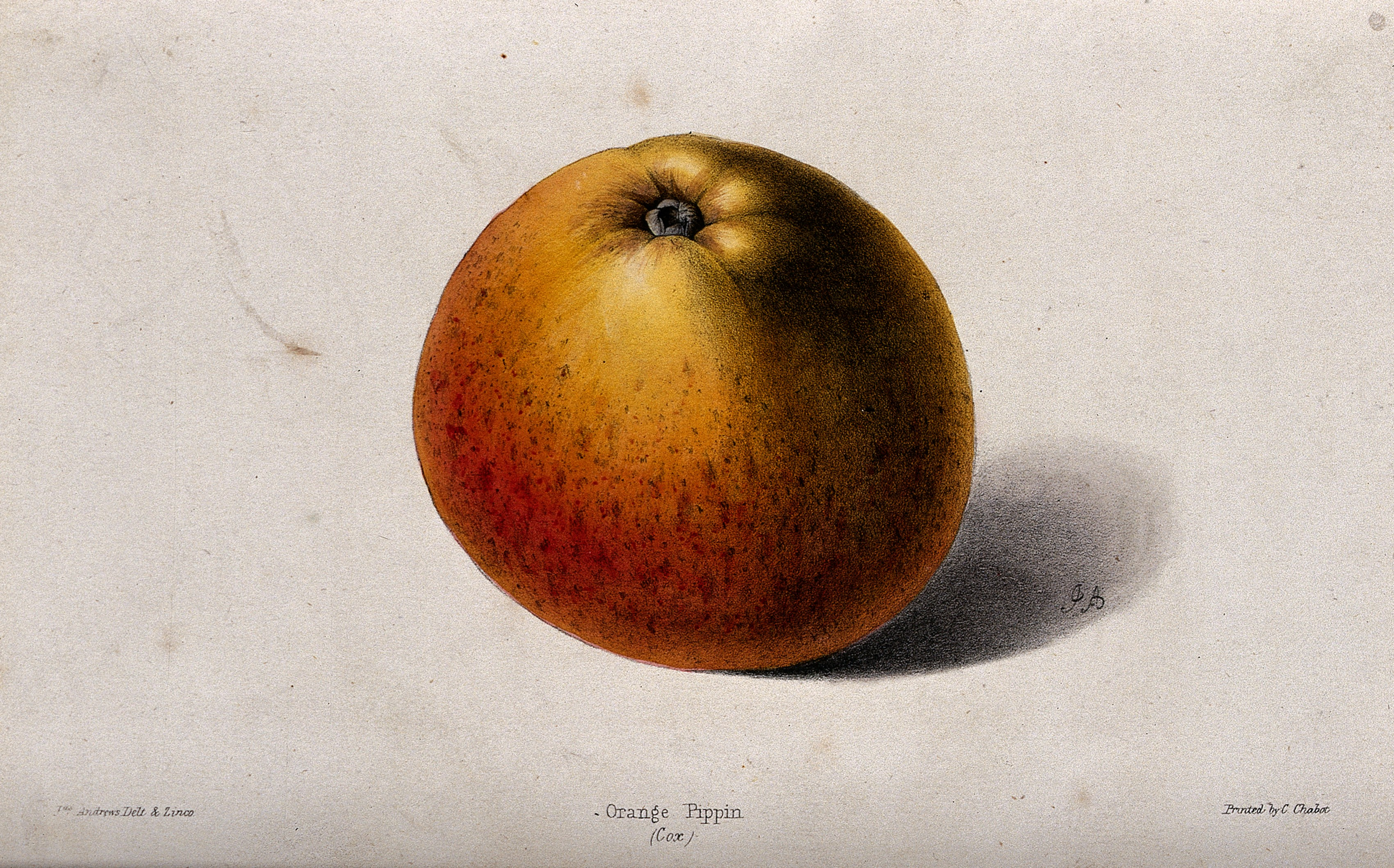
Illustration of the fruit

According to the Institute of Food Research, Cox's Orange Pippin accounts for over 50% of the UK acreage of dessert apples. The tree is a moderate grower and is annually productive. However, it can be difficult to grow in many environments, and tends to be susceptible to diseases such as scab, mildew, and canker, so it is rarely grown commercially in North America. Cox's Orange Pippin is also grown in Belgium and in the Netherlands, countries with a climate similar to that of Great Britain. In addition to the cultivation of Cox sports, apple breeders have hybridised Cox with other varieties to improve vigour, disease resistance, and yield, while attempting to retain the unique qualities of Cox's flavour.

Typical crop yield in kg
Year	Rootstock M27	Rootstock M9	Rootstock M26
3	1	2.5	1.7
4	2.6	3.4	2.6
5	3	5	5
6	8.6	15	18.3

Typical size distribution
-55mm	55-60mm	60-65mm	65-70mm	70-75mm	75-80mm
6%	19%	38%	28%	6%	3%

=== Sports ===
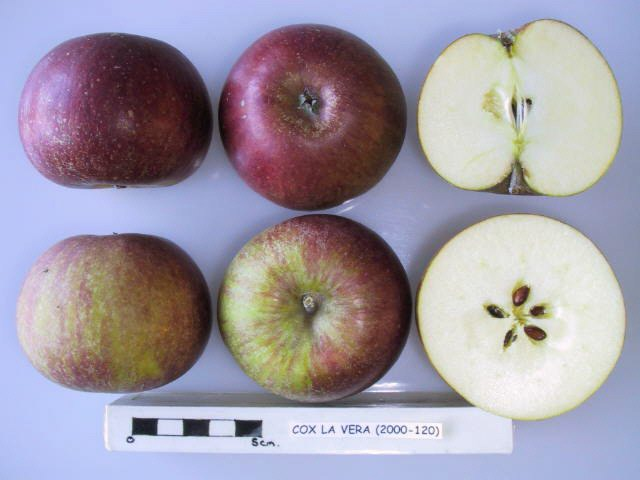
Cox La Vera

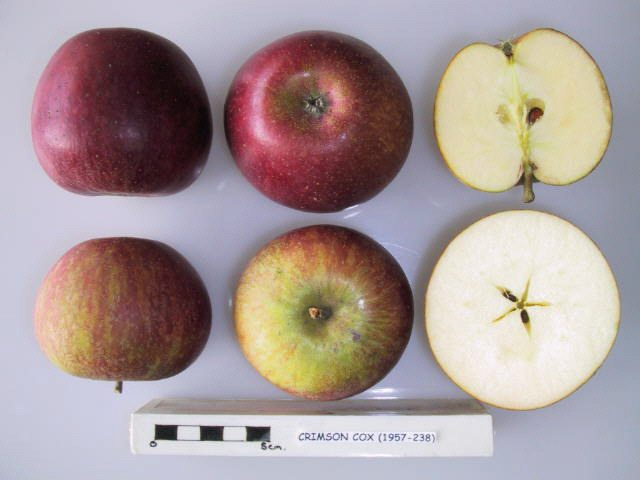
Crimson Cox

A number of sports of Cox's Orange Pippin have been discovered over subsequent years and propagated. These retain "Cox" in their names, e.g., Cherry Cox, Crimson Cox, King Cox, and Queen Cox.

Sports
Name	Origin	Discovered / Introduced
Bledisloe	New Zealand	1932/1934
Cherry Cox	Denmark	1942/
Cox La Vera	Netherlands	1986/
Cox Orange Kortegaard	Denmark	1914/
Crimson Cox	Herefordshire, England	c. 1913 / c. 1928
King Cox	Worcestershire, England	
Queen Cox	Berkshire, England	
Mendocino Cox	Northern California, USA	

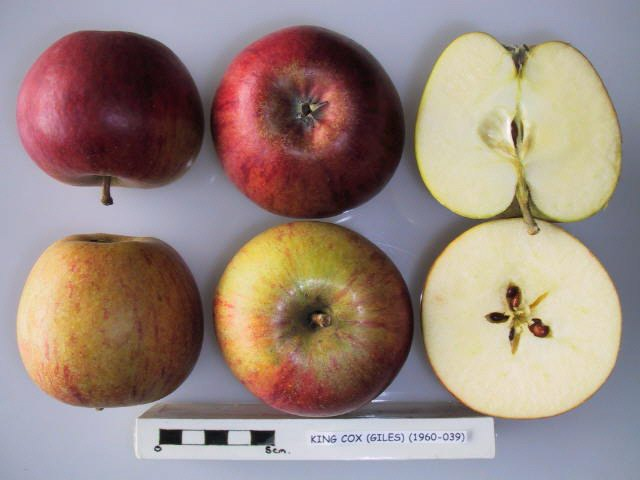
King Cox

== Descendant cultivars ==
Cultivar name (female parent × male parent)

- Acme (Cox's Orange Pippin × unknown)
- Alkmene (Cox's Orange Pippin × Geheimrat Doktor Oldenburg)

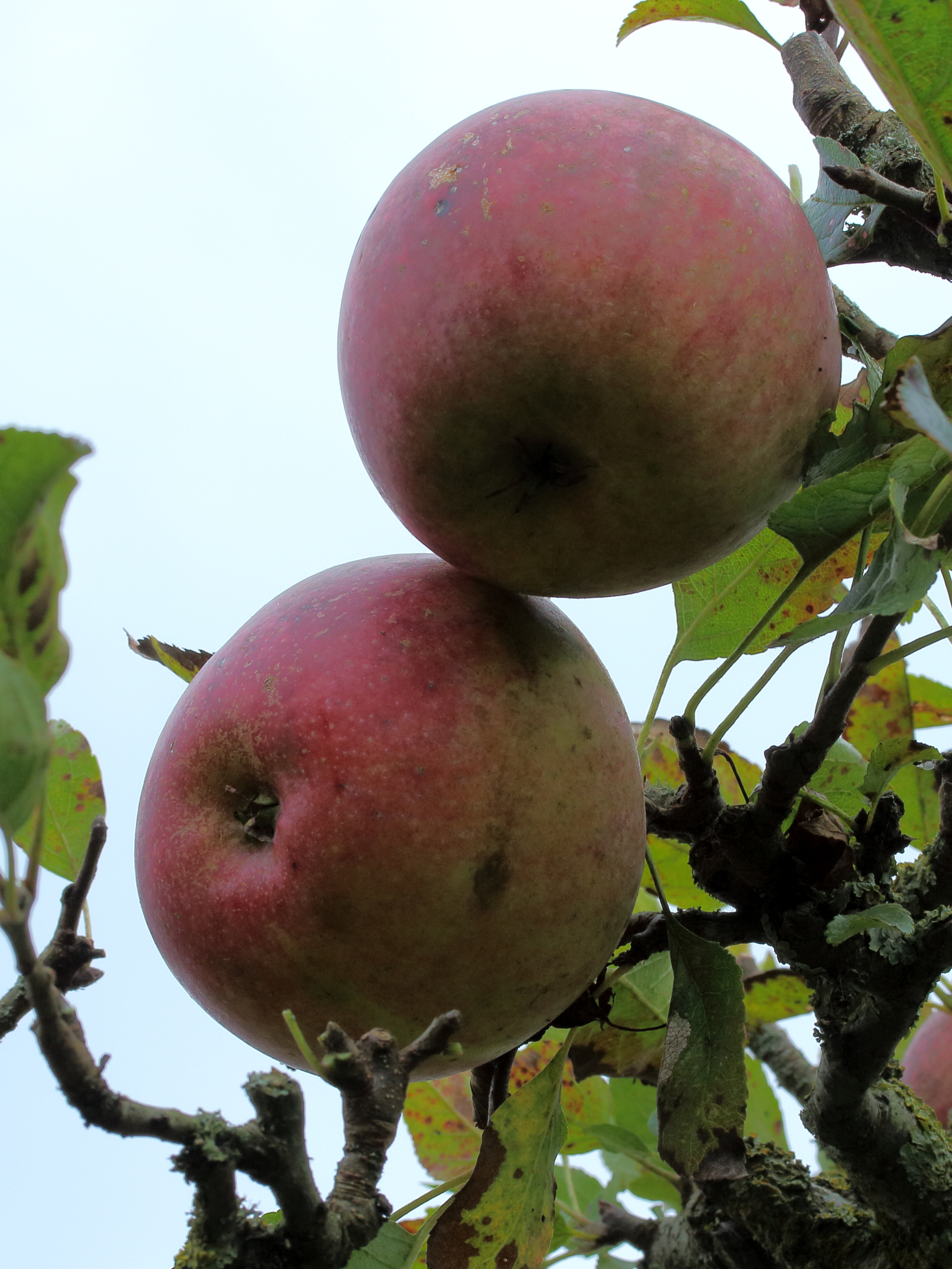
'Allington Pippin'

- Allington Pippin (Cox's Orange Pippin × King of the Pippins)
- Anna Boelens (Cox's Orange Pippin × Freiherr von Berlepsch)
- Apollo (Cox's Orange Pippin × Geheimrat Doktor Oldenburg)
- Arthur W. Barnes (Gascoyne's Scarlet × Cox's Orange Pippin)
- Barnack Orange (Cox's Orange Pippin × Barnack Beauty)
- Barry (McIntosh × Cox's Orange Pippin)
- Bountiful (Cox's Orange Pippin × Lane's Prince Albert)
- Carswell's Honeydew (Cox's Orange Pippin × unknown)
- Carswell's Orange (Cox's Orange Pippin × unknown)
- Charles Ross' (Cox's Orange Pippin × Peasgood's Nonsuch)
- Clivia (Geheimrat Doktor Oldenburg × Cox's Orange Pippin);
- Clopton Red (Cox's Orange Pippin × unknown)
- Cobra (Cox's Orange Pippin' × Bramley's Seedling)
- Downton Pippin (Cox's Orange Pippin × Golden Pippin)
- Dukat (Golden Delicious × Cox's Orange Pippin) or (Geheimrat Doktor Oldenburg × Cox's Orange Pippin)
- Dunning (Cox's Orange Pippin × McIntosh)
- Eden (John Standish × Cox's Orange Pippin)
- Edith Hopwood (Cox's Orange Pippin × unknown)
- Ellison's Orange (Cox's Orange Pippin × Cellini)
- Elstar (Golden Delicious × Cox's Orange Pippin)

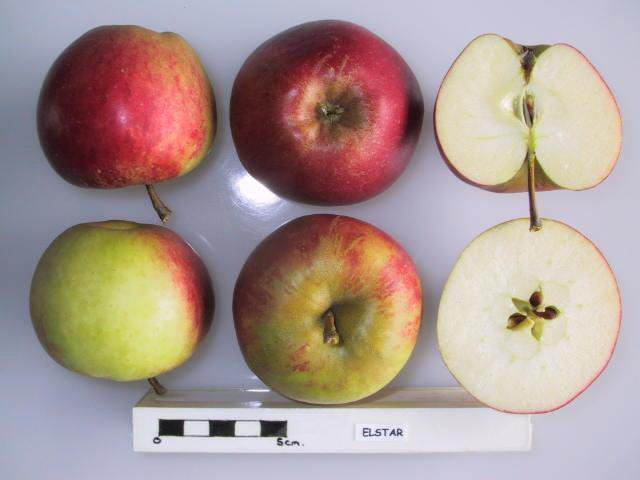
Elstar

- Fiesta (Cox's Orange Pippin × Idared)
- Francis (Cox's Orange Pippin × unknown)
- Freyburg (Cox's Orange Pippin × Golden Delicious)
- Gloucester Cross (Cox's Orange Pippin × unknown)
- Golden Nugget (Golden Russet × Cox's Orange Pippin)
- Hereford Cross (Cox's Orange Pippin × unknown)
- Herefordshire Russet (Cox's Orange Pippin × Idared)
- High View Pippin (Sturmer Pippin × Cox's Orange Pippin)
- Holstein (Cox's Orange Pippin × unknown)
- Ingrid Marie (Cox's Orange Pippin × Cox Pomona)
- James Grieve apple (Cox's Orange Pippin × Potts' Seedling)
- Jupiter (Cox's Orange Pippin × Starking Delicious)
- Karmijn de Sonneville (Cox's Orange Pippin × Jonathan)
- Kent (Cox's Orange Pippin × Jonathan)
- Kidd's Orange Red (Cox's Orange Pippin × Red Delicious)
- King George V (Cox's Orange Pippin × unknown)
- Langley Pippin (Cox's Orange Pippin × Gladstone)
- Laxton's Advance (Cox's Orange Pippin × Gladstone)
- Laxton's Epicure (Wealthy × Cox's Orange Pippin)
- Laxton's Exquisite (Cellini × Cox's Orange Pippin)
- Laxton's Fortune (Cox's Orange Pippin × Wealthy)
- Laxton's Pearmain (Cox's Orange Pippin × Wyken Pippin)
- Laxton's Superb (Cellini × Cox's Orange Pippin)
- Laxton's Triumph (King of the Pippins × Cox's Orange Pippin)
- Lucullus (Jonathan x Cox Orange Pippin)
- Lynn's Pippin (Cox's Orange Pippin × Ellison's Orange)
- Meridien (Cox's Orange Pippin × Falstaff)
- Merton Beauty (Ellison's Orange × Cox's Orange Pippin)
- Merton Charm (McIntosh × Cox's Orange Pippin)
- Merton Russet (Sturmer Pippin × Cox's Orange Pippin)
- Merton Worcester (Cox's Orange Pippin × Worcester Pearmain)
- Millicent Barnes (Gascoyne's Scarlet × Cox's Orange Pippin)
- Nuvar Cheerful Gold (Cox's Orange Pippin × Golden Delicious)
- Nuvar Freckles (Golden Delicious × Cox's Orange Pippin)
- Orangenburg (Cox's Orange Pippin × Esopus Spitzenburg)
- Pixie (Cox's Orange Pippin × Sunset)
- Polly Prosser (Cox's Orange Pippin × Duke of Devonshire)
- Prince Charles (Lord Lambourne × Cox's Orange Pippin)
- Prins Bernhard (Jonathan × Cox's Orange Pippin)
- Red Windsor (Cox's Orange Pippin × Alkmene)
- Rival (Peasgood's Nonsuch × Cox's Orange Pippin)
- Rosy Blenheim (Blenheim Orange × Cox's Orange Pippin)
- Rubens (Cox's Orange Pippin × Unknown)
- Rubinette (Golden Delicious × Cox's Orange Pippin)
- Ruby (Thorrington) (Cox's Orange Pippin × unknown)
- Saint Cecilia (Cox's Orange Pippin × unknown)
- Saint Everard (Cox's Orange Pippin × Margil)
- Sunburn (Cox's Orange Pippin × unknown)
- Suntan (Cox's Orange Pippin × Court Pendu Plat)
- Sunset (Cox's Orange Pippin × unknown)
- Sweetie Darling/East Malling A 3022 (Cox's Orange Pippin × Northern Spy)
- Tydeman's Late Orange (Laxton's Superb × Cox's Orange Pippin)
- Tydeman's October Pippin (Cox's Orange Pippin × Ellison's Orange)
- William Crump (Cox's Orange Pippin × Worcester Pearmain)
- Winter Gem (Cox's Orange Pippin × Grimes Golden)
- Winston/Winter King (Cox's Orange Pippin × Worcester Pearmain)
