= Discovery (apple) =

Apple cultivar

'Discovery'
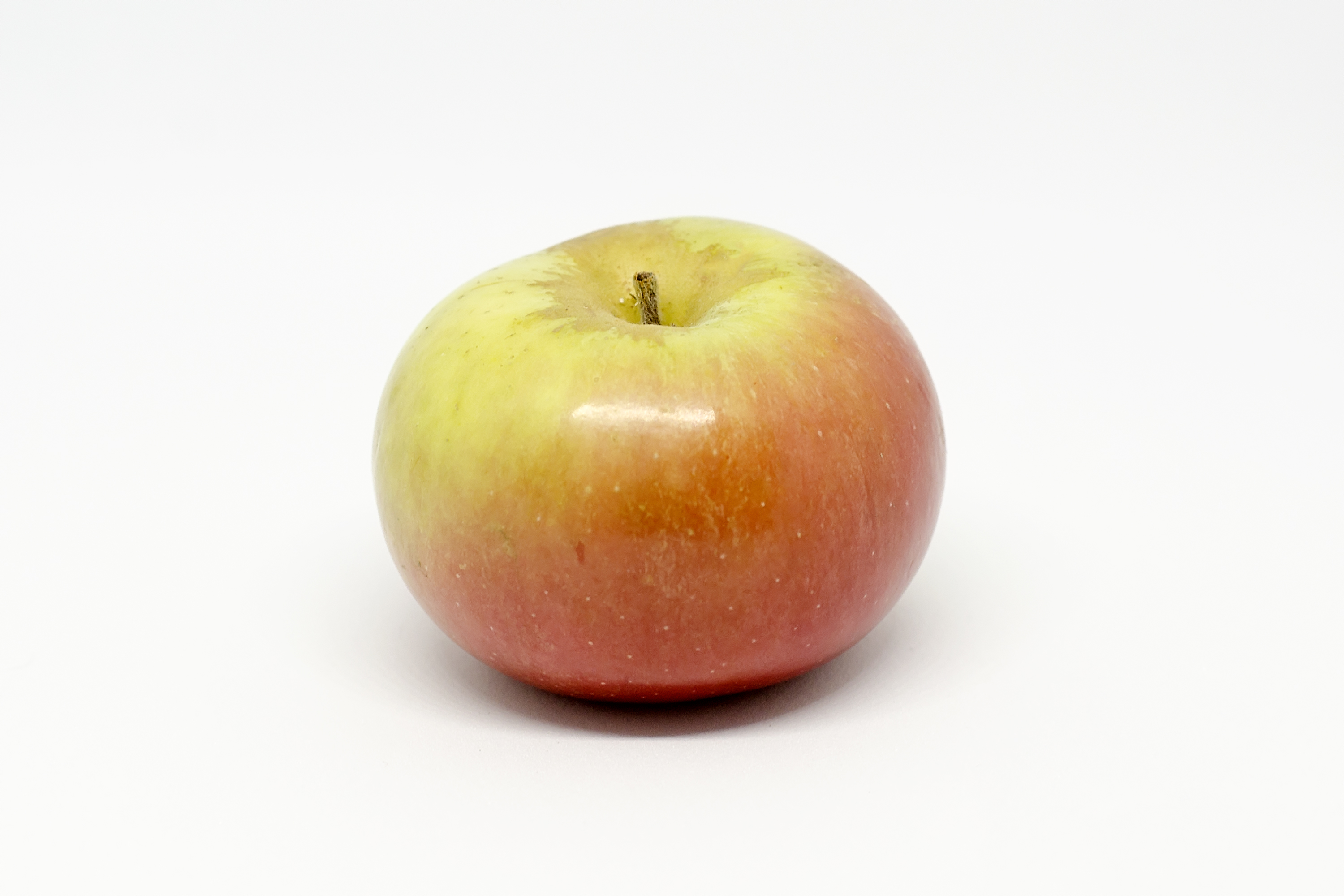
- Species: Malus domestica
- Hybrid parentage: 'Worcester Pearmain' × 'Beauty of Bath'
- Cultivar: 'Discovery'
- Breeder: George Dummer
- Origin: England, c. 1950

'Discovery' is an early season dessert apple cultivar. One of its parents was the 'Worcester Pearmain', with the pollinator 'Beauty of Bath'.

== History ==
'Discovery' was first introduced to the market by the Suffolk nurseryman Jack Matthews. In around 1949, George Dummer, a fruit farm worker from Blacksmiths Corner, Langham, Essex, raised several apple seedlings from an open-pollinated 'Worcester Pearmain'. He decided to transplant the best of the apples into his front garden, although the young tree was left unplanted and exposed to frost, wrapped only in sacking, for several months due to a family accident.

The tree survived and later came to the attention of Matthews, who took grafts and developed it (initially under the names 'Dummer's Pippin' and 'Thurston August') before releasing it to commerce under the name 'Discovery' in 1962. By the 1980s it had become the main early variety in the UK, though became rarer in later years as imports supplanted early apples in the market.

== Characteristics ==
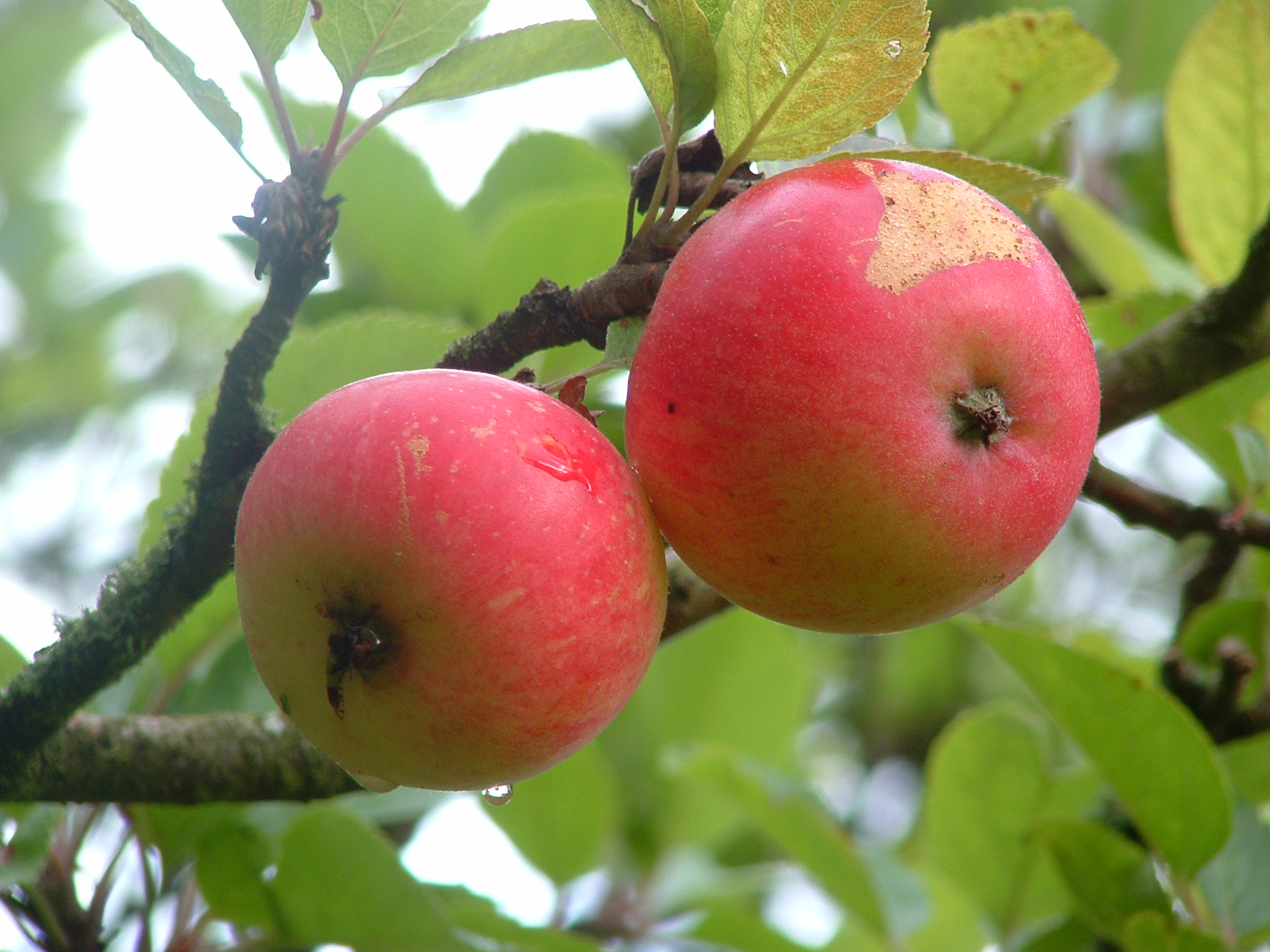
'Discovery' apples

The fruits are typically similar in appearance to its parent 'Worcester Pearmain', being small-medium in size, with small patches of yellow and largely flushed with crimson, sometimes completely covering the fruit, but tend to be slightly flatter. The flesh (and juice) of some fruit may be pinkish. The tree is a mid-season flowering variety; as with the pollinator 'Beauty of Bath', the fruits mature quickly, by August. Unlike many early apples, the fruits remain on the tree long enough to ensure ripening.The trees like plenty water to produce large fruits The fruit is loved by birds.

Although most references state that this is an early producing tree, the ripest of the fruits can be harvested later in the year: from late August to October the fruits become deep pinkish-red and the flesh is a yellowish white. It has an intensely bright flavour, is quite juicy, and is favored by many whether eaten raw or cooked.

Under good conditions the apples, when fresh, taste sweet and slightly tart. They generally have good keeping qualities, they store well when refrigerated.

Typical size distribution
<55 mm	55-60 mm	60-65 mm	65-70 mm	70-75 mm
8%	21 %	36 %	26 %	9 %

- Sugar 11.8 %
- Acidity (titratable acid as malic) 0.67 %
- Vitamin C 10-20 mg/ 100 gram
- Density 0.81
