= Ingrid Marie =

Apple cultivar

'Ingrid Marie'
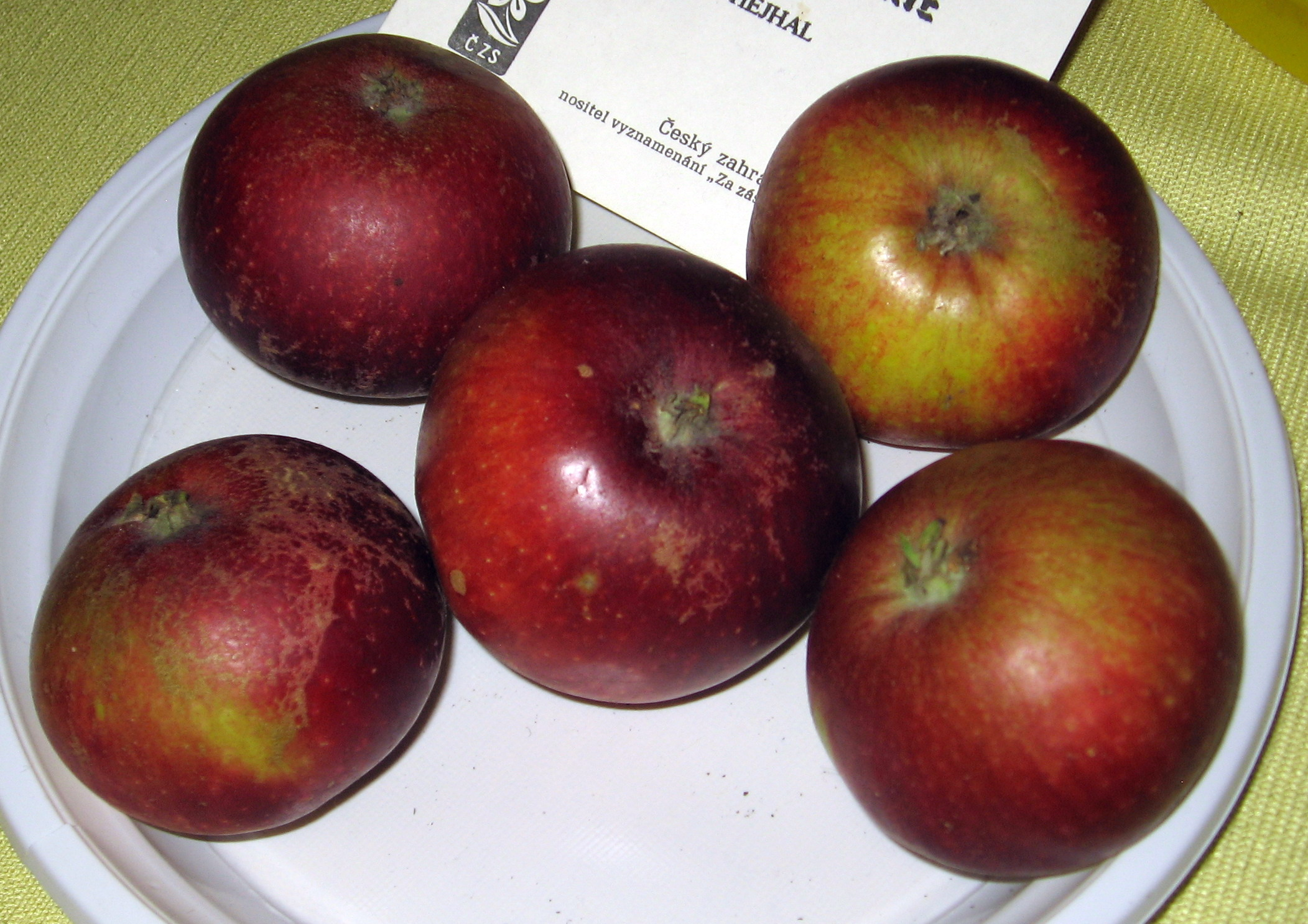
- Hybrid parentage: 'Cox's Orange Pippin' × Cox's Pomona
- Cultivar: 'Ingrid Marie'
- Origin: Denmark, 1910

Ingrid Marie is an apple cultivar.

It was cultivated by accident around 1910 on the premises of a school in Høed on the island of Funen in Denmark. It is a cross of the two English cultivars Cox's Orange Pippin and Cox's Pomona.

The apple has a red, firm skin and the color continues into the flesh underneath the skin.

'Ingrid Marie' trees grow very well in a moderate warm and humid climate.

== Descendant cultivars ==
- 'Elstar' ('Golden Delicious' × 'Ingrid Marie')
- Aroma (Ingrid Marie x Filippa)
