= Ellison's Orange =

Apple cultivar

'Ellison's Orange'
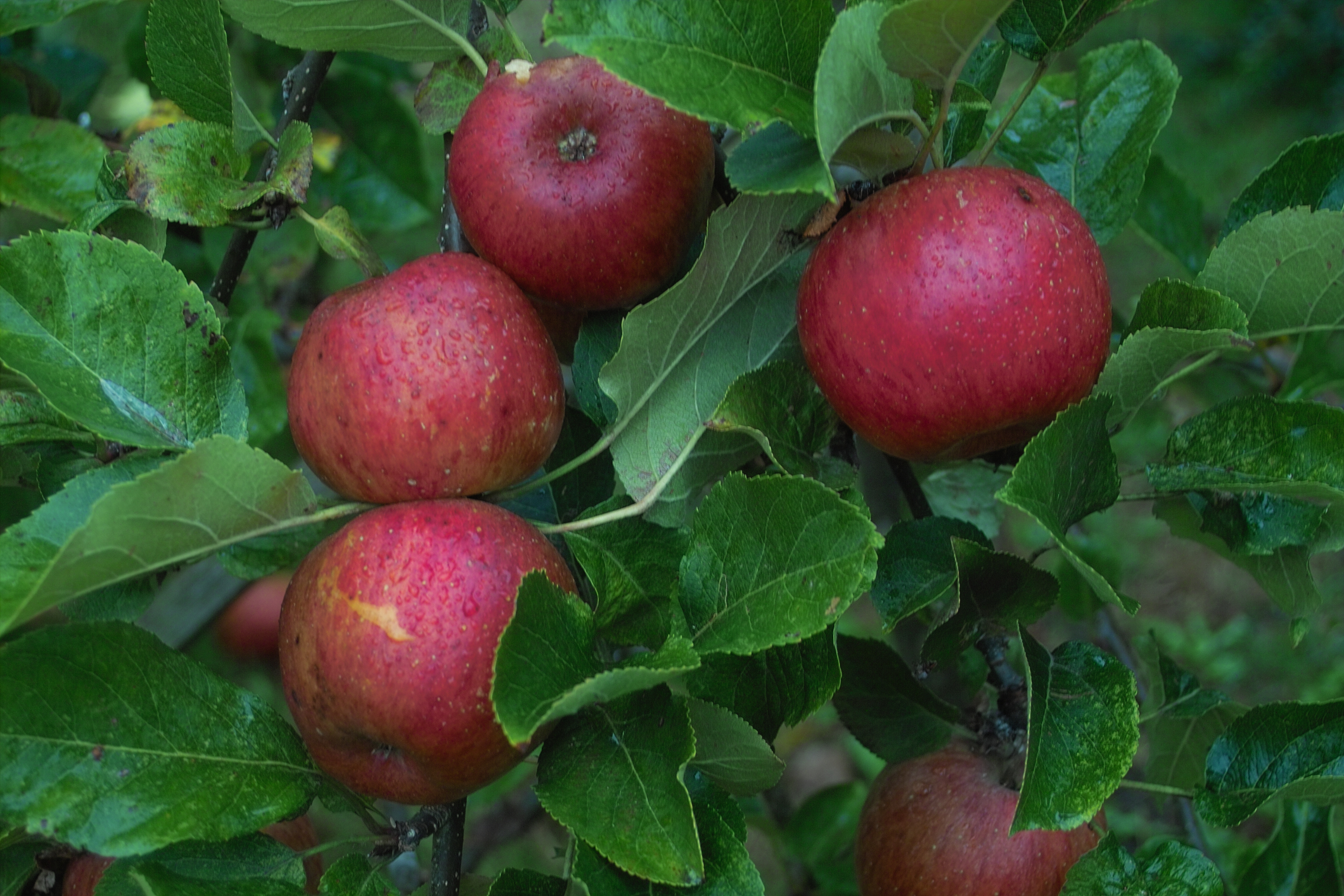
- Ripe red fruit
- Genus: Malus
- Species: Malus domestica
- Hybrid parentage: Cox's Orange Pippin x Cellini
- Cultivar: 'Ellison's Orange'
- Origin: England, Lincolnshire, before 1904

'Ellison's Orange' is an English cultivar of domesticated apple, it is a cross between the 'Cox's Orange Pippin' and 'Cellini', which it resembles most in looks and taste, but can develop a distinct aniseed flavor in storage. The variety is much more disease-resistant than Cox's and therefore easier to cultivate.

This cultivar is named after its developer, C. C. Ellison, a priest from Lincolnshire, United Kingdom, who probably crossed it c. 1904.

Ellison's is a mid-season apple. The flesh texture is quite soft and much juicier than Cox's, more resembling the flesh of a pear. Easy to grow, but requires good drainage, since it is highly susceptible to apple canker.

It is considered an English classic apple and is considered in the first rank of quality apples. It earned the Award of Garden Merit of the Royal Horticultural Society in 1993.

== Gallery ==
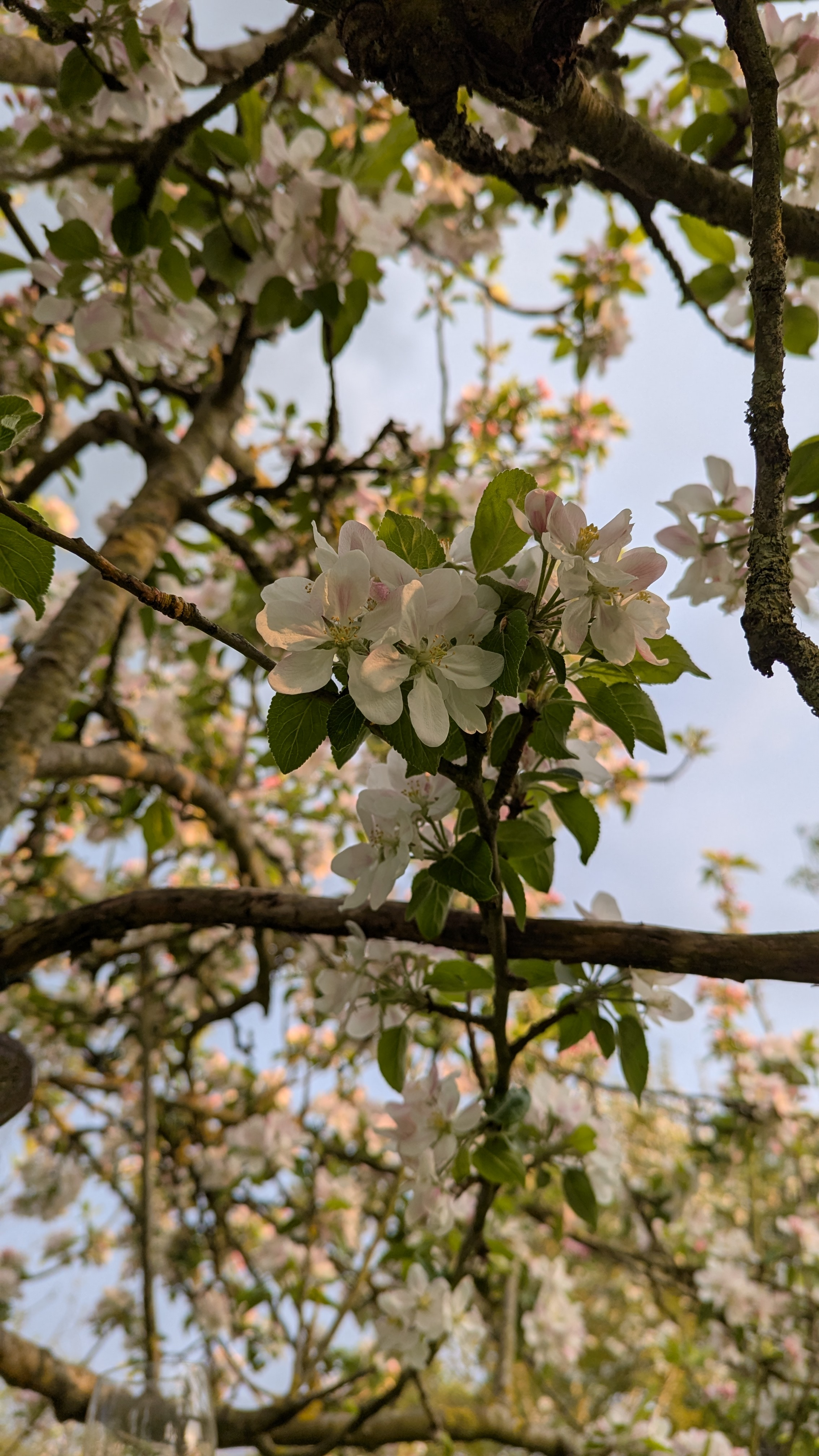
Blossom, Kemerton - Worcestershire (April 2025)

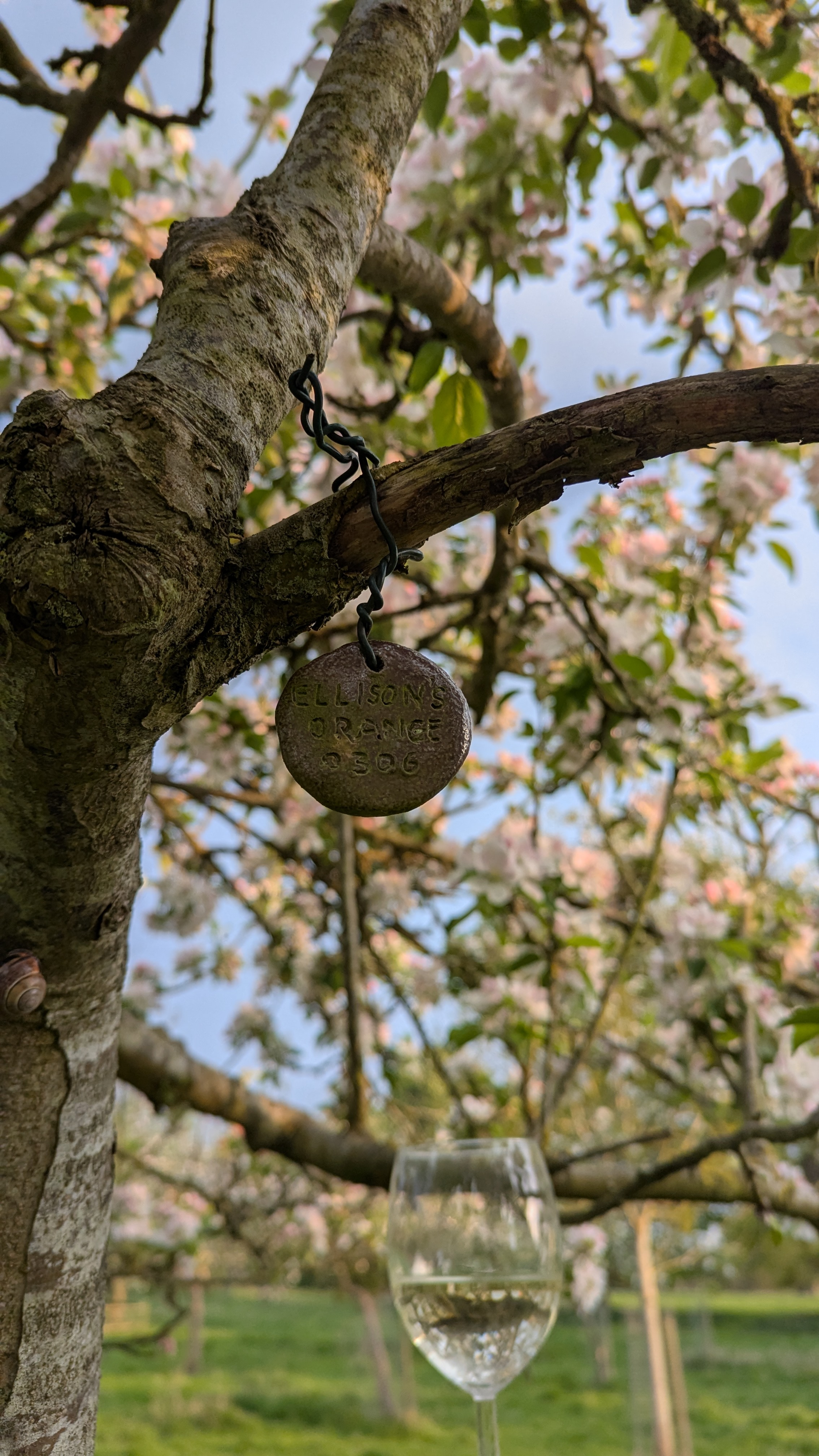
Variety label, Kemerton (2025)

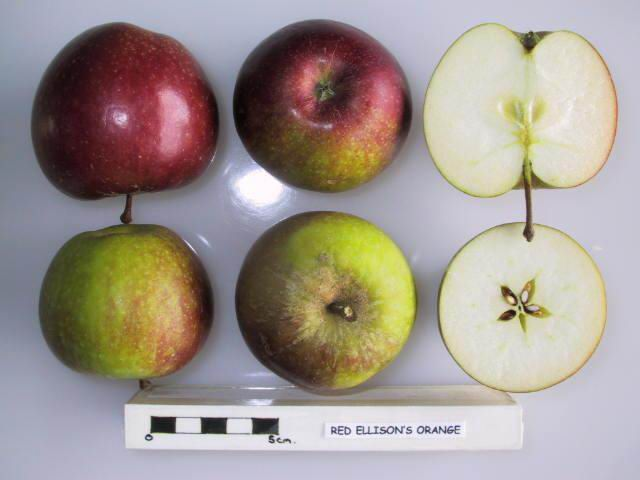
Cross section

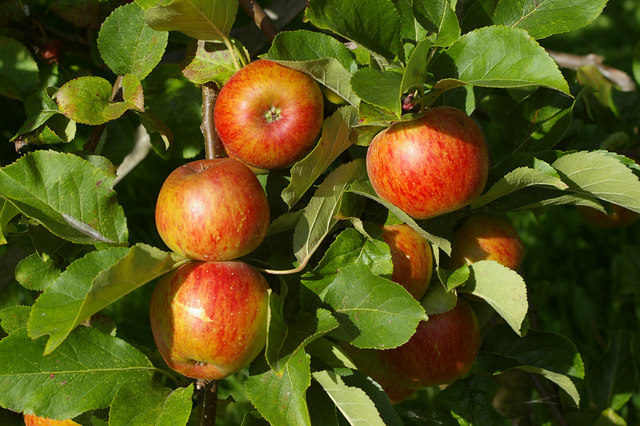
During growth
