= Clivia (apple) =

German apple cultivar

Malus pumila 'Clivia'
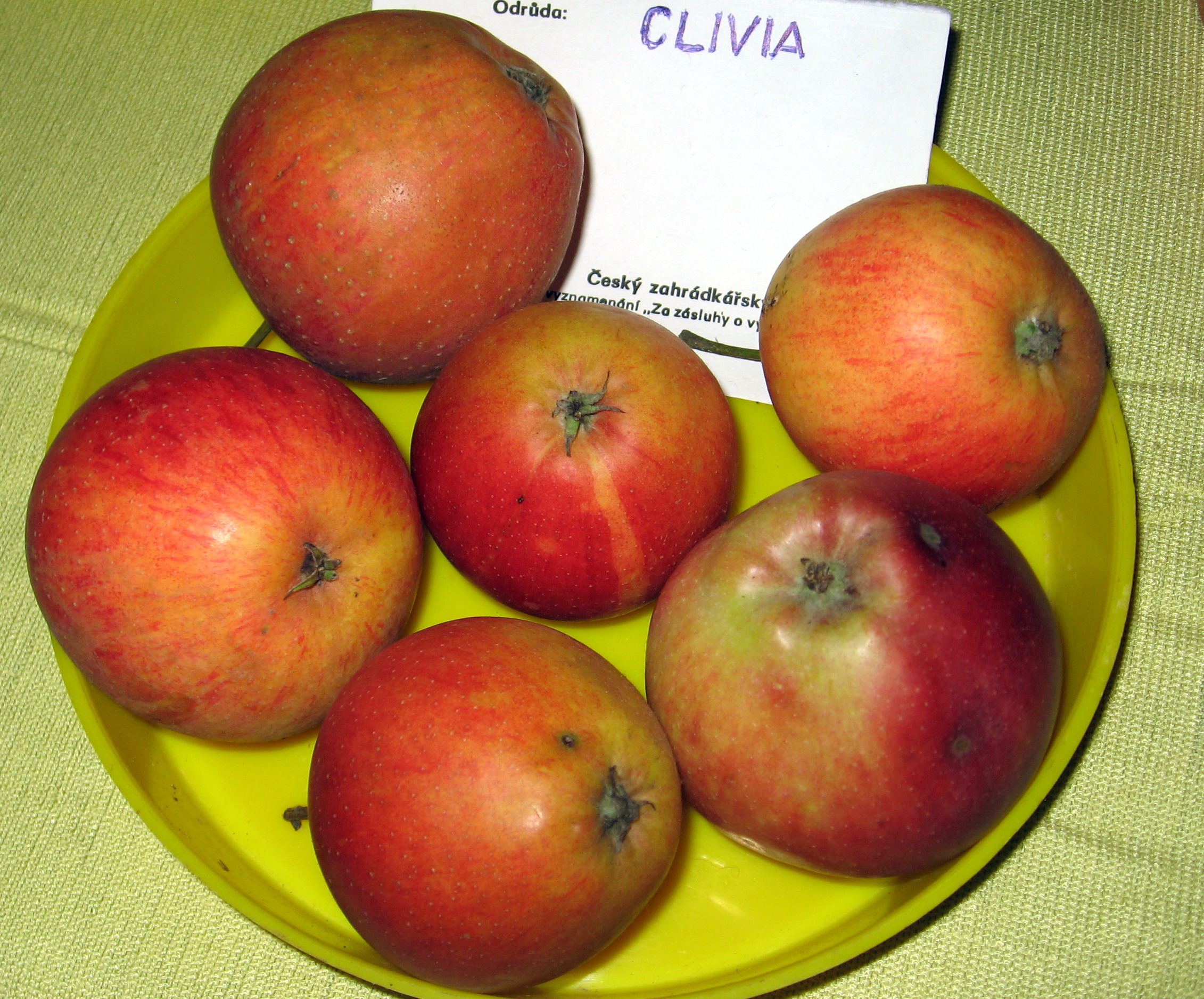
- Genus: Malus
- Species: Malus pumila
- Hybrid parentage: Geheimrat Dr. Oldenburg × Cox's Orange Pippin
- Cultivar: 'Clivia'

'Clivia' is a German apple cultivar. It was created at the Institut für Acker- und Pflanzenbau of Müncheberg, in Märkisch-Oderland in eastern Germany, which at that time was in the German Democratic Republic. It is a hybrid of 'Geheimrat Dr. Oldenburg' and 'Cox's Orange Pippin'. It was reported as a new variety in 1964 and 1965; it was parent of a new cultivar, 'Pinova', in 1965.

== Hybrids ==
Cultivars that descend from 'Clivia' include: 'Pilot' ('Clivia' × 'Undine'); 'Pinova' ('Clivia' × 'Golden Delicious'); 'Rubinstep' ('Clivia' × 'Rubin'); and 'Reanda'.
