= Richard Cox (horticulturist) =

English horticulturalist

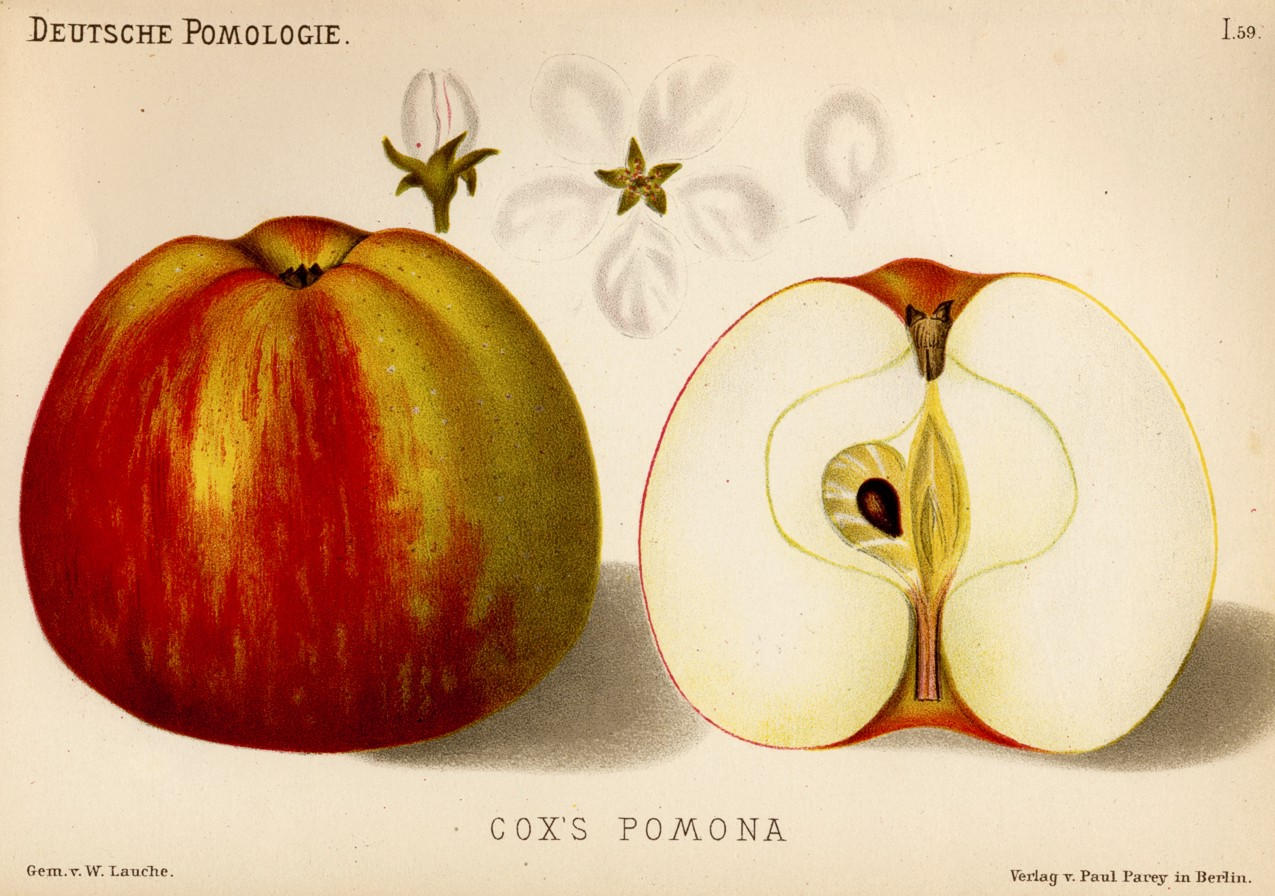
Illustration of Cox's pomona.

Richard Cox (c. 1766 – 20 May 1845) was an English brewer and horticulturist who bred the apple varieties Cox's Orange Pippin and Cox's Pomona.

Cox operated the Black Eagle Brewery located at 27 White's Grounds, Bermondsey, London until 1820, when he retired with his wife Ann to The Lawns (later Colnbrook Lawn) in Colnbrook, Slough, Buckinghamshire (now Berkshire), England, to pursue his hobby of horticulture. The house sat on two acres of land in the vicinity of Rodney Way and Daventry Close on the north side of the old Bath Road (now the High Street), about a mile west of the modern-day boundary of Heathrow Airport.

In 1830 he planted pips in his orchard Satisfied with the quality of the fruit produced by two of his seedlings, in 1836 he supplied grafts to E. Small & Son, the local nurseryman who offered the first trees for sale in 1840. The two varieties, Cox's Orange Pippin and Cox's Pomona, remained mostly unknown until Charles Turner of the Royal Nurseries in Slough, impressed by their quality, began to offer them in his catalog in 1850. Other English nurserymen began to graft and sell Cox's Orange Pippin trees, and by 1883 it was one of the most popular apples in the country.

Cox died in 1845 without seeing the success of the apple varieties to which he gave his name.

By 2007, Cox's Orange Pippin, grown worldwide, was Britain's most popular apple, accounting for over 50% of UK orchard acreage, and 48% of sales. Ownership of the brewery passed to Noakes & Company after Cox's death and would continue operation under different owners, ultimately Courage, until 1930. The original Cox's Orange Pippin tree in Colnbrook was blown down in a storm in 1911, but two trees, grafted from the original, were still standing in the orchard as of 1933. The site is currently occupied by a block of low-rise flats also called The Lawns.

Richard Cox outlived his wife by eight years and died in 1845, aged 79; both are buried in the churchyard at St.Mary's in Harmondsworth. A memorial orchard stands near the site of The Lawns in Colnbrook, consisting of Cox's Orange Pippin, Cox's Pomona, Ribston Pippin, and Blenheim Orange with metallic benches in the shapes of the letters C, O and X.
