= Margil =

Apple cultivar

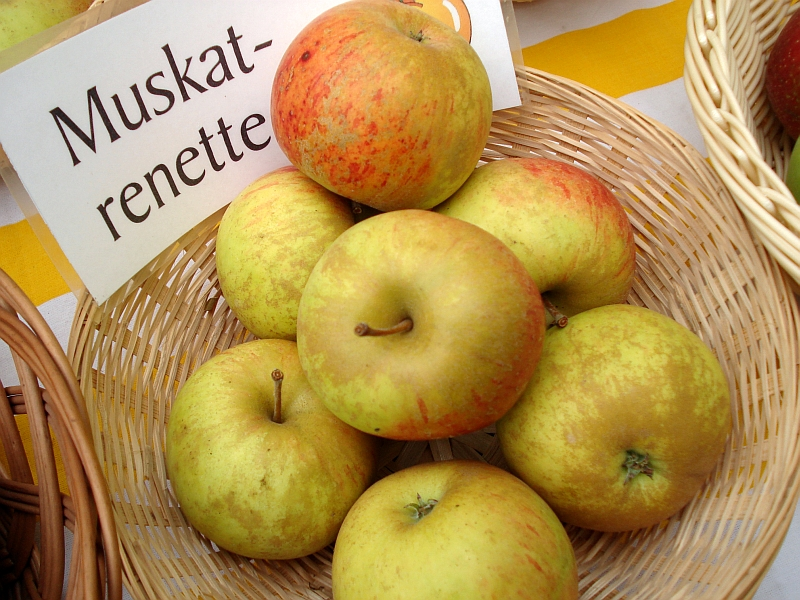
- Genus: Malus
- Species: Malus domestica
- Origin: probably France or Netherlands

The (White) Margil is a very old and historically extremely influential cultivar of domestic apple. It ripens in the later half of the apple season and is suitable for fresh eating from November to February. It has a weak growth habit, making it unsuitable for dwarfing rootstocks. It is moderately resistant to diseases and preferably grown in richer soils and milder climates.

It has been described as early as 1608. It probably originated in Normandy, France, where it was frequently used for juicing. It is known to have been cultivated in England since before 1750. It has a large number of known offspring varieties, including the particularly famous Cox's Orange Pippin.
