= James Grieve (apple) =

Apple cultivar

Malus domestica 'James Grieve'
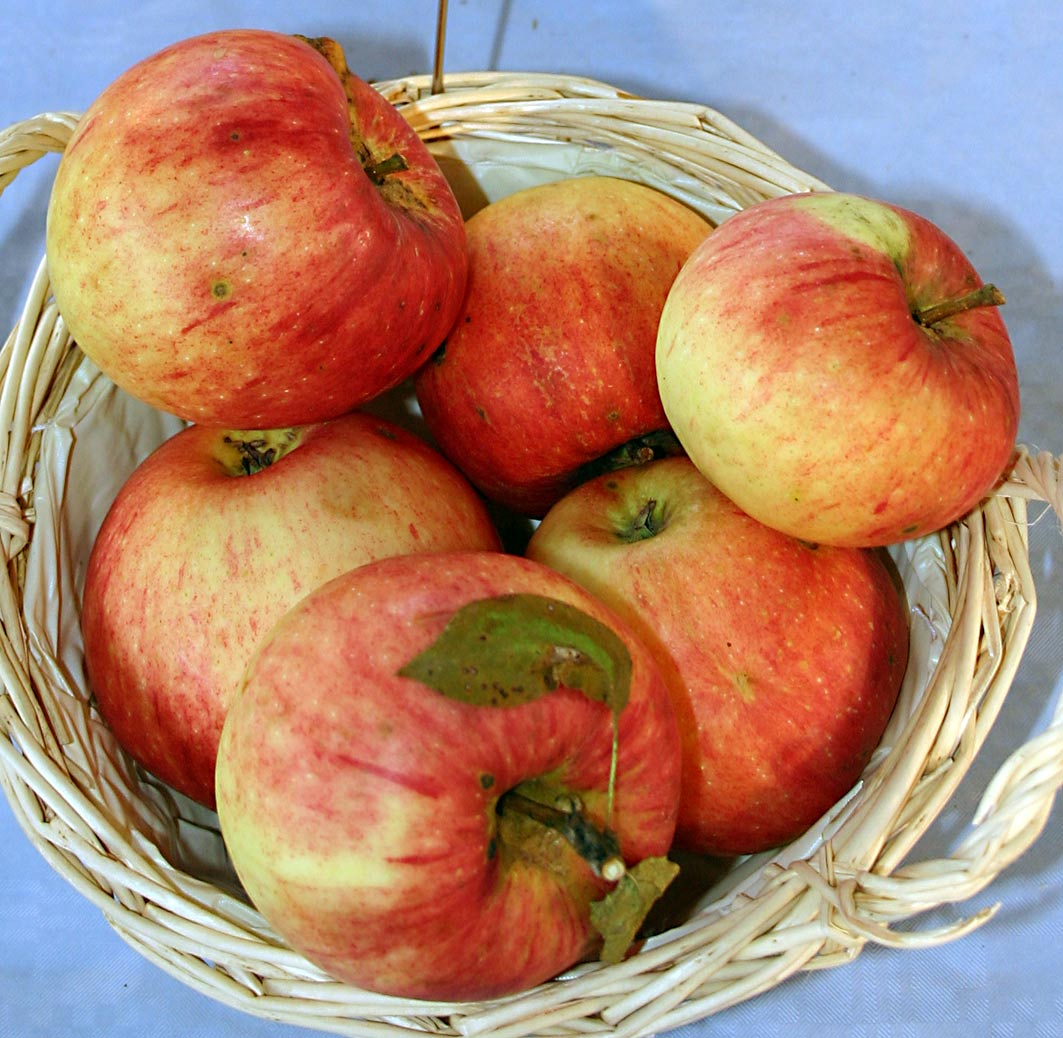
- Hybrid parentage: 'Likely Pott's Seedling' × 'Cox's Orange Pippin'
- Cultivar: 'James Grieve'
- Origin: Edinburgh, Scotland 1890s

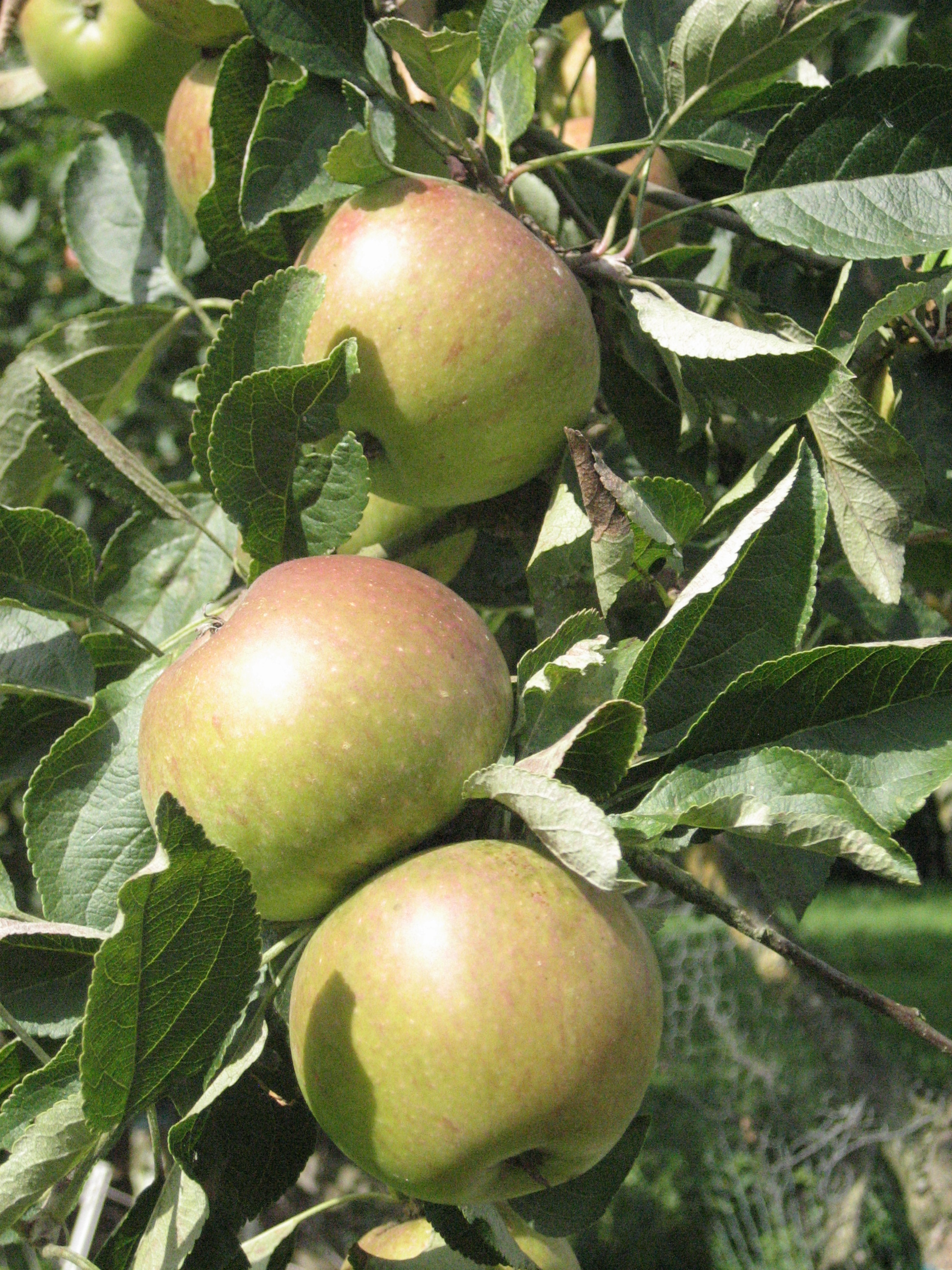
James Grieve apples on tree.

James Grieve is an old variety of apple. It gets its name from its breeder, James Grieve, who raised the apple from pollination of a Pott's Seedling or a Cox's Orange Pippin apple (most likely both) in Edinburgh, Scotland some time before 1893.

This is a savoury, juicy apple with strong acidity at first, which then mellows as the fruit matures during September, but the flesh softens soon thereafter. When picked early, it makes a sweet and delicate stewed apple, but then can be used as a dessert apple. James Grieve apples used to be grown all over Europe and were delivered to the city markets via train or horse-and-cart, but because they bruised easily they had to be carefully packed in laundry-type wicker baskets filled with straw. The fruit cannot sustain modern supermarket handling, and so they are now only grown in gardens and for direct sale to consumers. Nonetheless, James Grieve is considered a good apple because it has exceptional taste qualities, it produces fruit every year, it is disease-resistant, and it is a good polleniser for other apples. It may drop early in warm weather. It is also a good apple for making apple juice.

- Density 0.75
- Sugar 11.5 %
- Acidity 8.2 gram / litre
- Vitamin C 10-20 mg/100 gram

Typical size distribution
<55 mm	55-60 mm	60-65 mm	65-70 mm	70-75 mm	75-80 mm	80-85 mm
2 %	7 %	18 %	37 %	27 %	7 %	2 %

== Descendants ==
- Elan (Golden Delicious x James Grieve)
- Falstaff (James Grieve x Golden Delicious)
- Greensleeves (James Grieve x Golden Delicious )
- Reglindis
- Remo
- Sunset
