= Beauty of Bath =

Apple cultivar

'Beauty of Bath'
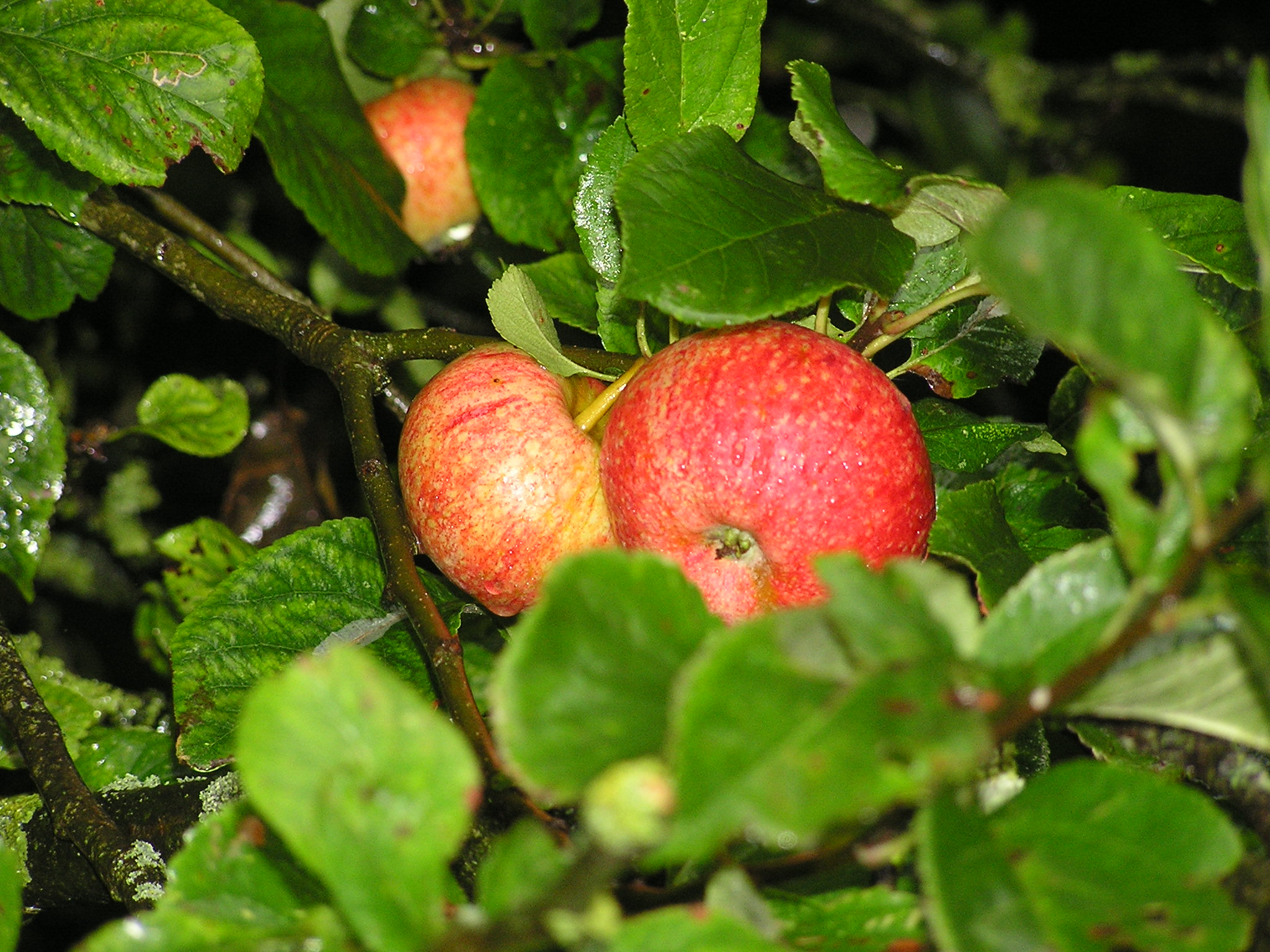
- Species: Malus pumila
- Cultivar: 'Beauty of Bath'
- Origin: Bailbrook House near Bath, Somerset, England

'Beauty of Bath' is a dessert apple cultivar.

It was propagated in 1864 by George Cooling and awarded a Royal Horticultural Society First Class Certificate in 1887. Sugar 13%, acid 13g/litre, vitamin C 12mg/100g.

'Beauty of Bath' is a very early apple usually cropping in August but can crop as early as July (e.g. in 2011) or last into September. It bruises easily, so is best picked by hand. Fruits can drop early by themselves, often when not completely ripe. Traditionally, straw was placed under the trees to lessen damage to falling fruit.

The fruit's taste is sharp at first but sweetens later. The flesh is white but sometimes has a red flush under the skin (approximately 20% occurrence noticed in 2011 in one orchard).

The tree is in flowering group 2 with pale pink blossom and medium to large, blue-green, leaves.

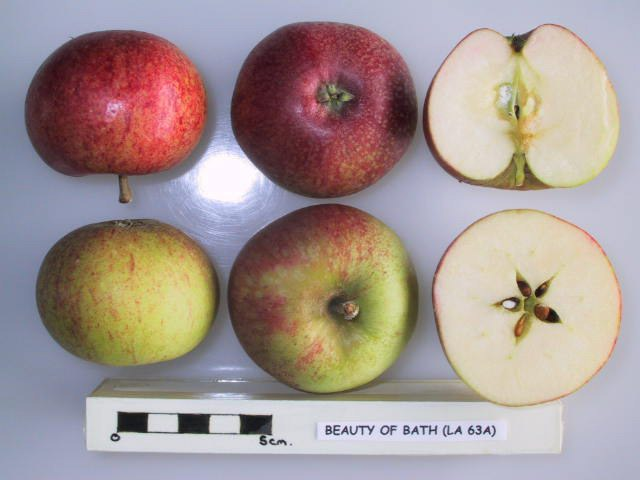
Beauty of Bath (LA 63A) apple, cross-sectioned

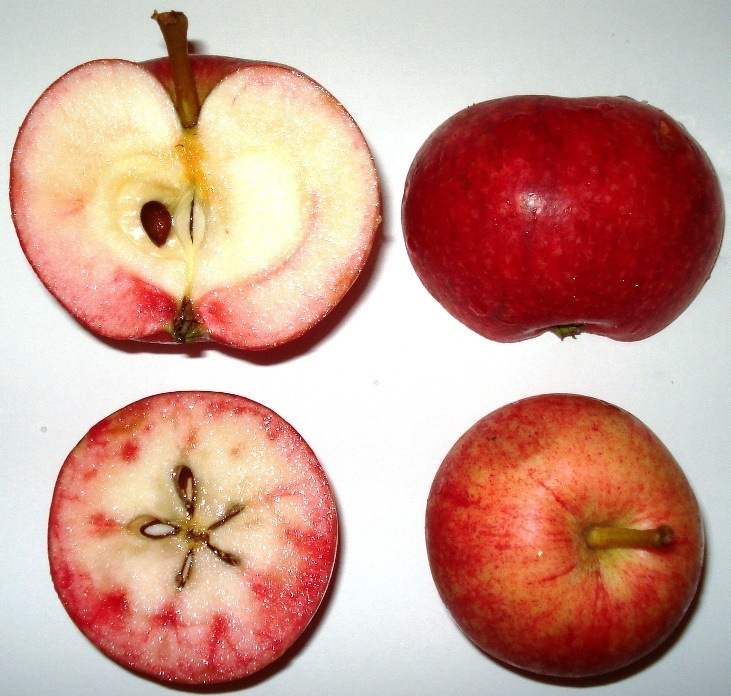
Cross-section exhibiting red flush beneath the skin
