= Geheimrat Dr. Oldenburg =

German apple cultivar

'Geheimrat Dr. Oldenburg'
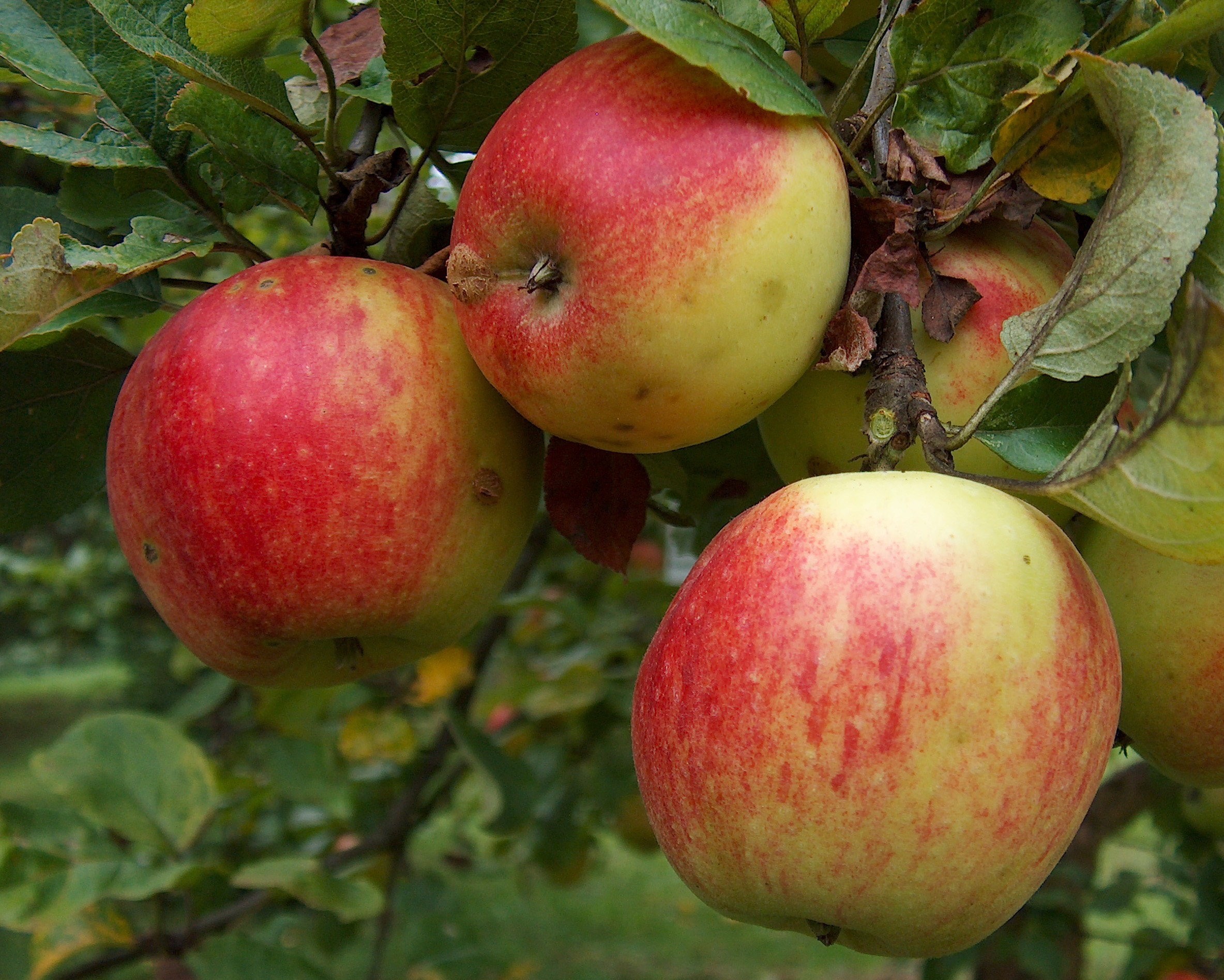
- Genus: Malus
- Species: Malus pumila
- Hybrid parentage: 'Minister von Hammerstein' × 'Baumanns Renette'
- Cultivar: 'Geheimrat Dr. Oldenburg'
- Origin: Germany, 1897

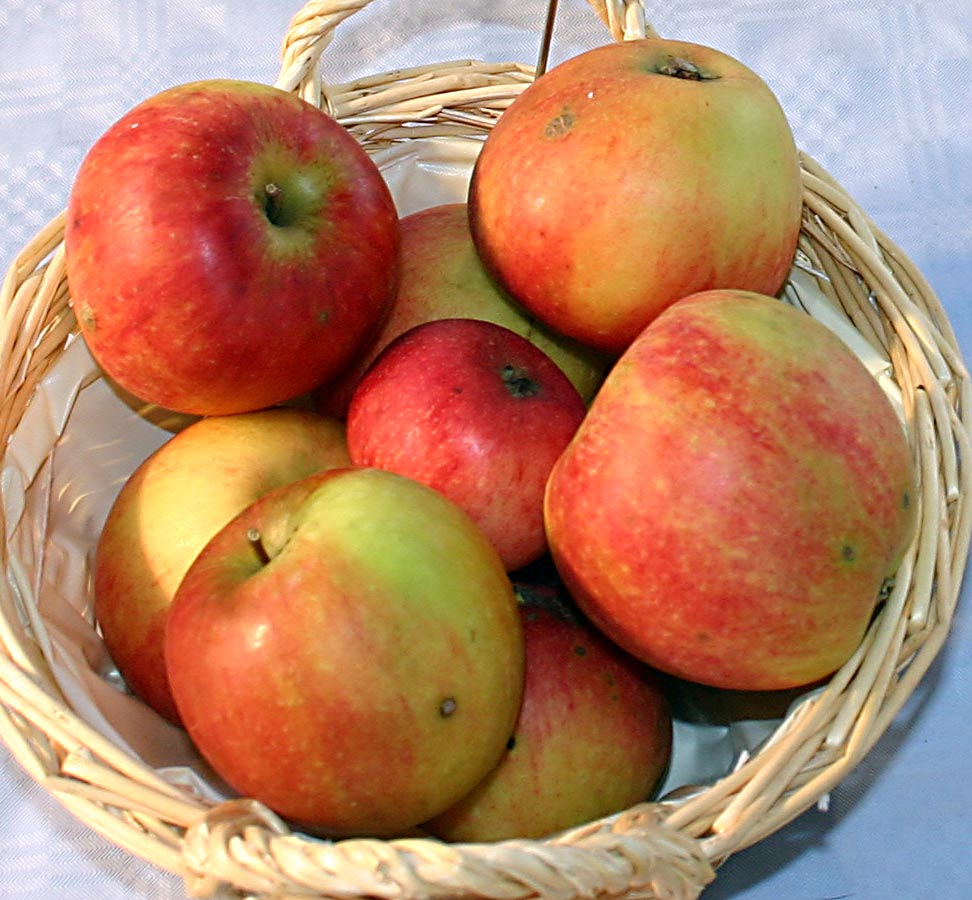
Fruit

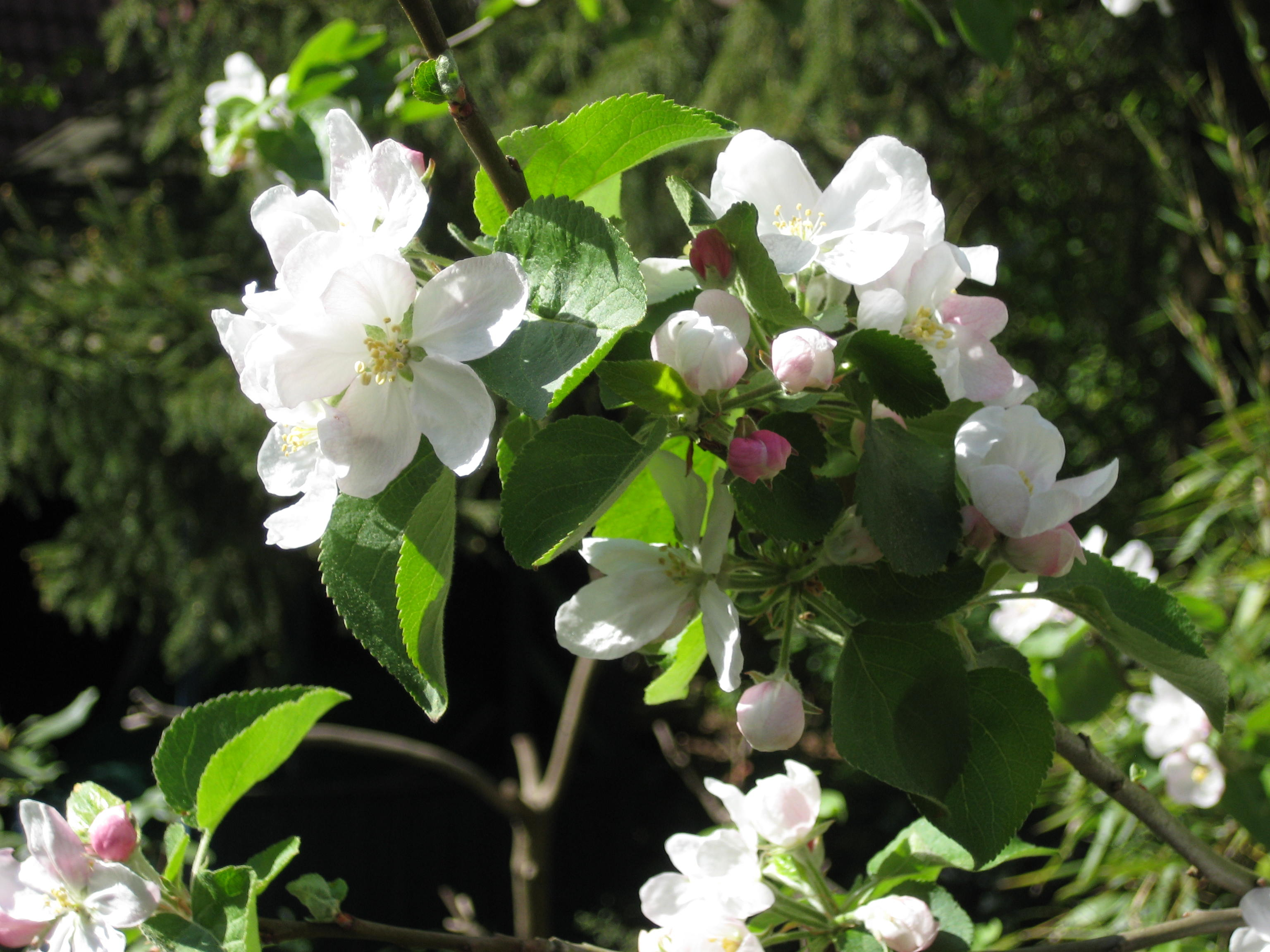
Flowers

'Geheimrat Dr. Oldenburg' is a German apple cultivar. It was created in 1897 at the Höheren Lehranstalt für Obstbau of Geisenheim in the Rheingau, in Hesse in central Germany. It may also be known as 'Geheimrat Doktor Oldenburg', 'Geheimrat Oldenburg', or simply 'Oldenburg'. It is a quite different apple from the older Russian cultivar 'Duchess of Oldenburg', also sometimes known simply as 'Oldenburg'.

== History ==
The cultivar was created in 1897 at the Höheren Lehranstalt für Obstbau of Geisenheim in the Rheingau, in Hesse in central Germany. It is documented as a hybrid of 'Minister von Hammerstein' and 'Baumanns Renette'; A single-nucleotide polymorphism study has found it be a hybrid of 'Alexander' and 'Ananas Reinette'.

== Hybrids ==
Cultivars that descend from 'Geheimrat Dr. Oldenburg' include: 'Alkmene' (Geheimrat Dr. Oldenburg × Cox's Orange Pippin); 'Apollo' (Cox's Orange Pippin × Geheimrat Dr. Oldenburg); 'Clivia' (Geheimrat Dr. Oldenburg × Cox's Orange Pippin);; 'Elektra' (Cox's Orange Pippin x Geheimrat Doktor Oldenburg); 'Roba' (Geheimrat Dr. Oldenburg x unknown); and possibly 'Dukat' (Geheimrat Dr. Oldenburg × Cox's Orange Pippin).
