= Elstar =

Apple cultivar

Malus domestica 'Elstar'
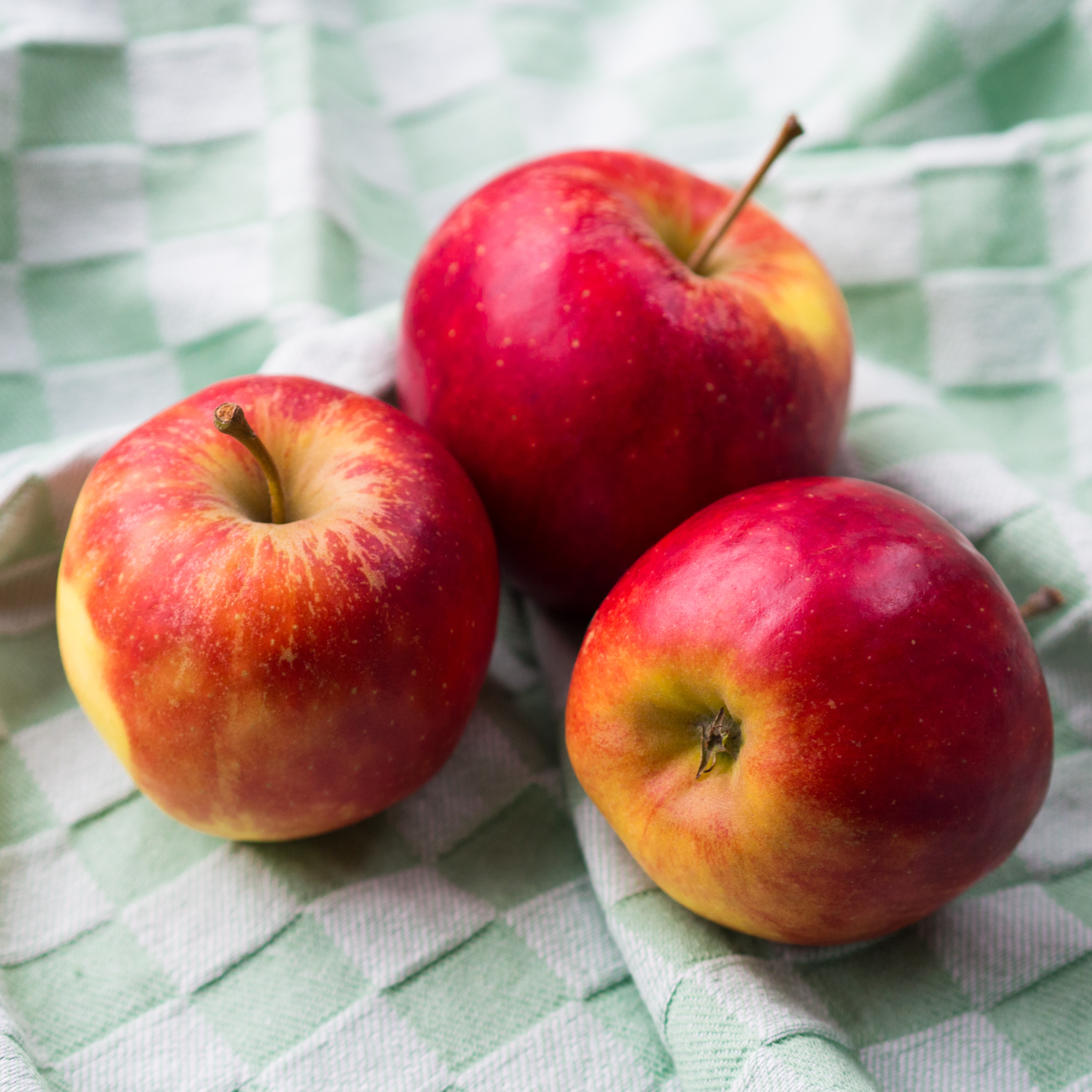
- Hybrid parentage: 'Ingrid Marie' × 'Golden Delicious'
- Cultivar: 'Elstar'
- Origin: (Netherlands) Elst, 1950s

The Elstar apple is an apple cultivar that was developed in the Netherlands in Elst in the 1950s by crossing Golden Delicious and Ingrid Marie apples. It quickly became popular, especially in Europe. It was introduced to the United States in 1972. It remains popular in Continental Europe, planted extensively in Germany, Holland, Belgium, France, but less so in the United Kingdom.

The Elstar is a medium-sized apple whose skin is mostly red with yellow showing. The flesh is white and has a crispy texture. It may be used for cooking and is especially good for making apple sauce. In general, however, it is used in desserts due to its sweet flavour.

Pick early October, keeps until December.

== Descendant cultivars ==
- Santana (Elstar × Priscilla)
- Ecolette (Elstar × Prima)
- Collina (Priscilla × Elstar)

== Disease susceptibility ==
- Scab: some
- Powdery mildew: some
