= Worcester Pearmain =

Apple cultivar

'Worcester Pearmain'
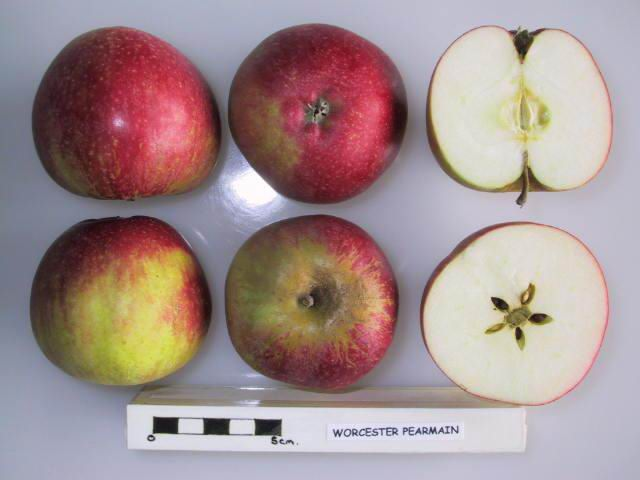
- specimen from the United Kingdom's National Fruit Collection
- Genus: Malus
- Species: M. domestica
- Cultivar: 'Worcester Pearmain'
- Origin: England, before 1874

'Worcester Pearmain' is an early season English cultivar of domesticated apple, that was developed in Worcester, England, by a Mr. Hale of Swanpool in 1874. It was once the most popular cultivar in England for early autumn harvest and is still popular to keep in the garden. It has been extensively used in apple breeding.

It is a cross between Devonshire Quarrenden and an unknown parent.

This red flushed pearmain sometimes has a strawberry-like flavour, and its early season property is passed on in breeding programs to other cultivars. Taste is smooth and sweet, ideal for fresh eating, mostly recommended for stewed apple. Keeps fresh for approximately one week.

The tree has slightly low vigor and average disease resistance. It produces attractive flowers, which is a feature for itself. The blossoms are partially self-sterile. Crop is heavy and harvest at early-mid season. It was awarded a First Class Certificate from the RHS in 1875. This Pearmain earned the Award of Garden Merit by the Royal Horticultural Society in 1993.

== See also ==
- Akane (apple)
