= Edelborsdorfer =

Apple cultivar

Malus Edelborsdorfer
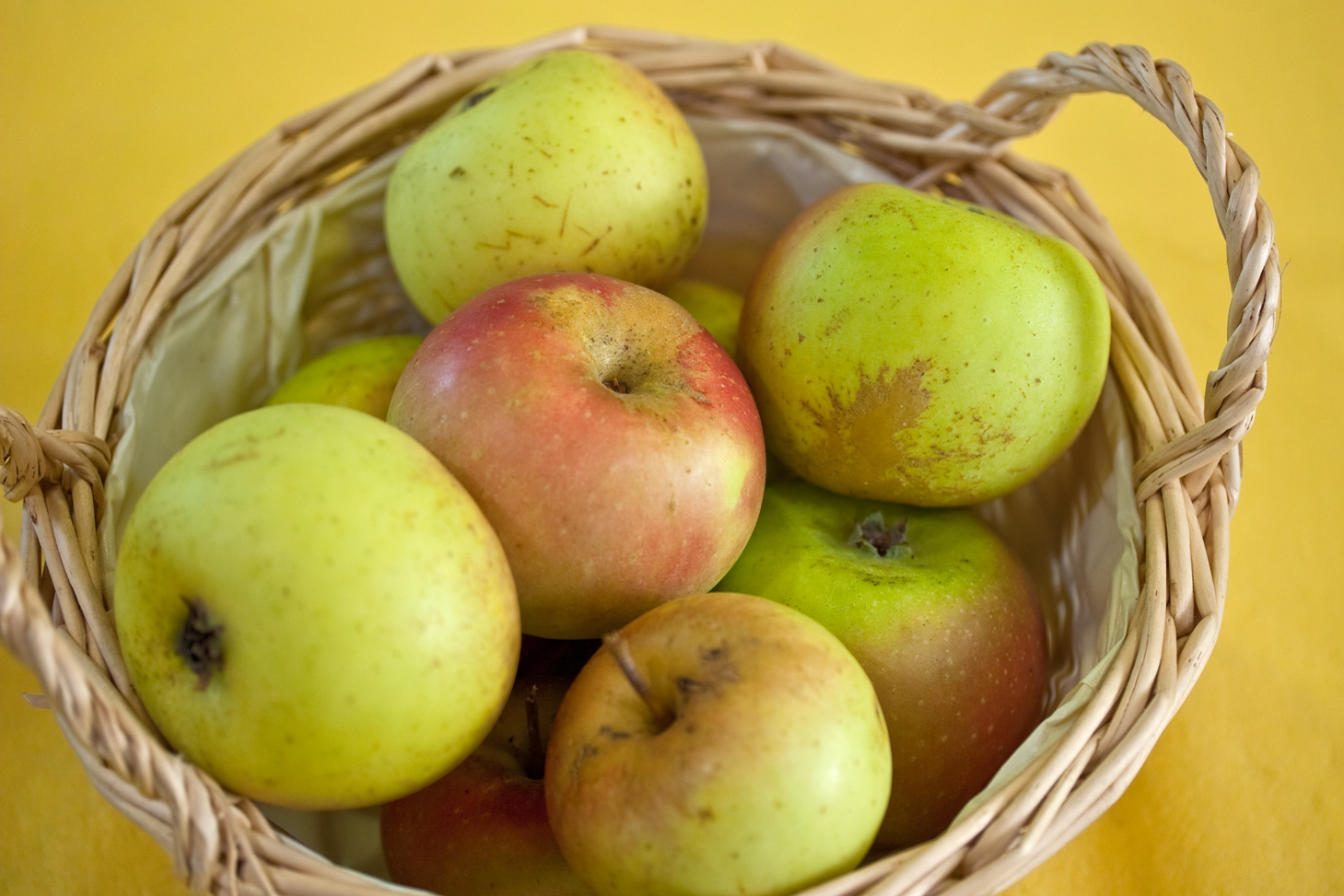
- Species: Malus domestica

Edelborsdorfer, also known as Edler Winterborsdorfer, Reinette Batarde, Reinette d’Allemagne, Leipziger Renette, Rubinapfel, Schwarzer Borsdorfer or Zigeunerapfel is a dessert apple, and it is the oldest apple cultivar in Germany, introduced in the 1600s. The fruit is medium-sized, varying from 2.4 inches high. Its skin is green with red flush and russet.

== History ==
The early written history of this apple is of Borsdorfer, which, according to Bunyard, goes back to 1561. Britain's Queen Charlotte was so partial to the Borsdorfer apple, from her native land, that she had a considerable quantity of them imported from Germany every year, in the early 19th century. The first use of the term Edelborsdorfer was by Berghuis in 1858, when he wrote the ‘de Nederlandsche Boomgard’ in Holland. Lucas and Oberdieck also used the name in 1875. It seems that the name Edelborsdorfer was first noted in Britain when Bunyard, in ‘A Handbook of Fruits’ in 1920, gave Edelborsdorfer as a synonym of Borsdorfer. The prefix ‘Edel’ in German means something greater or more noble and we suspect it was a later apple than Borsdorfer, which we also have and which appears to be slightly different.
