= Kalmar Glasäpple =

Apple cultivar

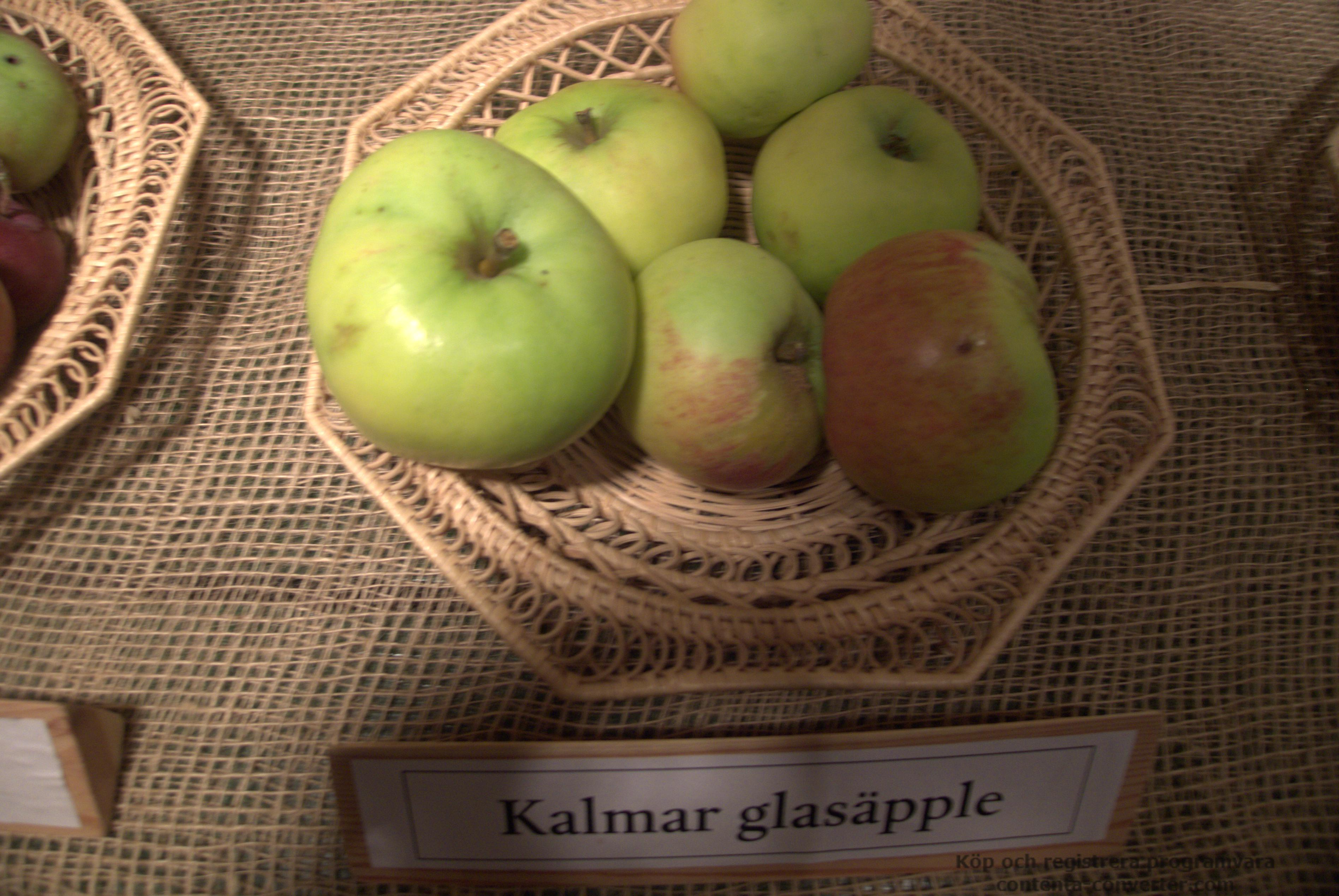
- Kalmar Glasäpple
- Origin: Sweden or Germany

Kalmar Glasäpple, (meaning glossy apple from Kalmar; probably the same as Gelbe Spanische Renette) is an apple, the provenance of which has been disputed. This apple species has been grown in Sweden since the 18th century. The blossoming is late. Any apple variety flowering at the same time as Kalmar Glasäpple is good for fertilization. The body is light yellow, and the taste is a mix of acidity and sweetness. Harvesting may begin in early October and it is typically fully ripe in early December. The apples should remain good for one to two months. Kalmar Glasäpple is suitable for eating as is, as well as for cooking.
