= Golden Orange (apple) =

Apple cultivar

Malus domestica 'Golden Orange'
- Hybrid parentage: 'PRI 1956-6 × ' Ed Gould Golden '
- Cultivar: 'Golden Orange'
- Origin: Italy 1996 CRAFRU-Roma

The Golden Orange apple is an apple cultivar that was first developed in Italy in the 1970s (released 1996) by crossing PRI 1956-6 and Ed Gould Golden apples.

Some properties include a resistance to scab, moderate vigor, medium-late blooming season, moderately large size, symmetry, lack of russeting, ripening period longer than that of Golden Delicious, and long storage ability.
