= Cosmic Crisp =

Apple cultivar

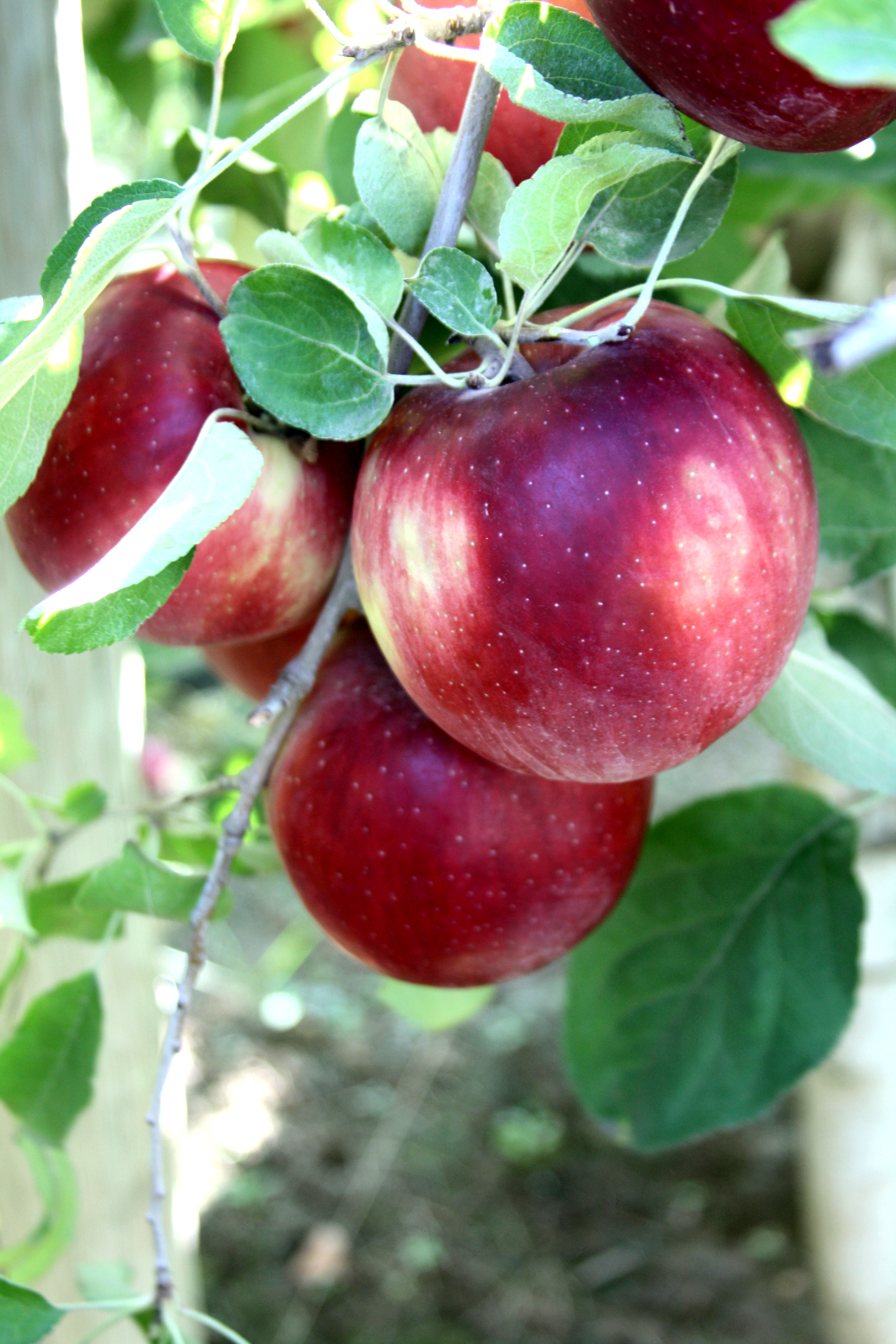
- Genus: Malus
- Species: Malus domestica
- Hybrid parentage: Honeycrisp × Enterprise
- Cultivar: WA 38
- Marketing names: Cosmic Crisp
- Origin: (United States) Washington State University, 1997

Cosmic Crisp is an American apple with the cultivar designation WA 38, a cross between Honeycrisp and Enterprise apples. Breeding began in 1997 at Washington State University, and the apple was commercially released in 2019. The Cosmic Crisp has seen strong and growing sales since its launch. As of 2025, it was the sixth most-produced apple variety in the United States.

== Characteristics ==
The Cosmic Crisp is a cross between Honeycrisp and Enterprise apples. It is intended to have the texture and juiciness of the Honeycrisp, and the late-ripening behavior and long storage of the Enterprise. The Cosmic Crisp is characterized mainly by uniformly colored dark red skin, dense firm flesh, and an improved shelf life. It is capable of lasting in cold storage for more than ten months and does not brown quickly once cut open. The look of the apple's light lenticels against its wine-red skin reminded focus groups of a galaxy against a night sky, which led to it being named the Cosmic Crisp. Compared to the Honeycrisp, the Cosmic Crisp is fairly easy to cultivate, making it popular among farmers. A typical harvest produces a yield of 85% or higher, compared to only 60% for the Honeycrisp. But like the Honeycrisp, the Cosmic Crisp is slow to brown and can be used for making salads and charcuterie boards. The tree is resistant to drought, making it well-suited to the climate of Eastern Washington. The Cosmic Crisp is the first widely grown apple variety developed in Washington and is exclusively grown there per an agreement with WSU that expires in March 2027.

The apple ripens at the same time as the Red Delicious and is expected by producers to replace a large part of Red Delicious stocks, as the latter continues to lose market demand. The Cosmic Crisp apple was made available to consumers in 2019, after twenty years of development. Cosmic Crisp apples are harvested from August until November.

The New York Times described the apple as "dramatically dark, richly flavored and explosively crisp and juicy", making it "the most promising and important apple of the future". FoodRepublic.com called it "firmer than the Honeycrisp, but not too firm. And it is high in both sugar and acidity, making it far superior to the Red Delicious, Gala and Fuji varieties as well."

== Development and release ==
Breeding began in 1997 at the Washington State University (WSU) Tree Fruit Research and Extension Center in Wenatchee and was initially overseen by Bruce Barritt. Kate Evans completed the research after Barritt's retirement from WSU.

The variety was first planted for commercial use in spring 2017, with twelve million trees pre-ordered by Washington state orchards. Interest in the cultivar was so high, the trees initially had to be distributed to apple farmers in a lottery held in 2014—WSU had planned to provide 300,000 saplings but were met with requests for four million. Within three years, over thirteen million Cosmic Crisp trees had been planted. Lawsuits emerged between WSU and a Seattle spin-off, which the university claimed distributed over 100,000 trees improperly. WSU owns the Cosmic Crisp patent.

== Marketing and popularity ==
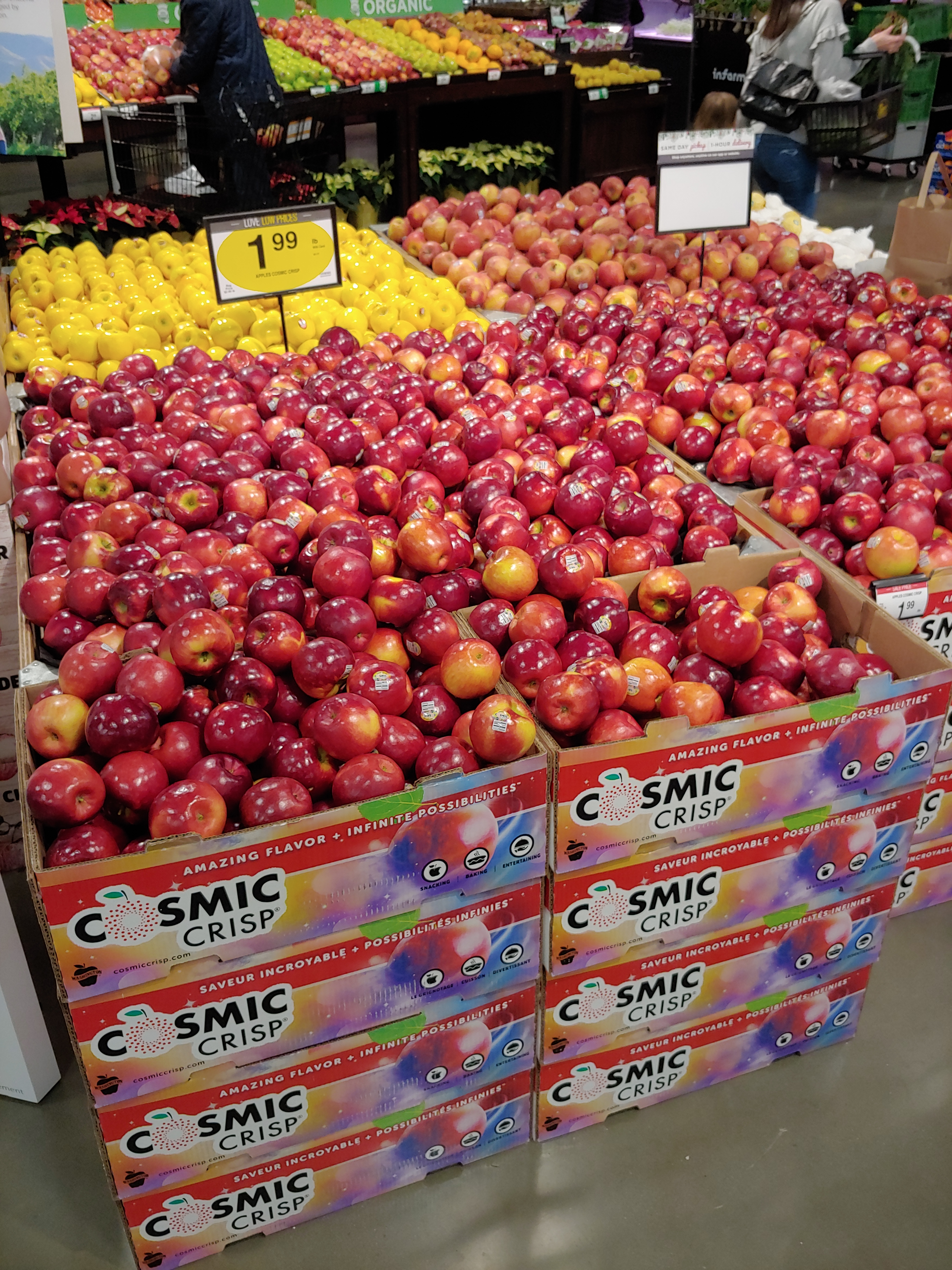
Apples for sale shortly after the December 1, 2019, introduction in the Seattle area

A campaign worth $10 million was funded by Washington State through the Washington Apple Commission and other agencies to promote the new apple variety, using the taglines "Imagine the Possibilities" and "The Apple of Big Dreams". Said to be the largest marketing campaign in the history of the apple industry, it included payments to social media influencers and a partnership with a touring children's production of Johnny Appleseed. The term "Cosmic Crisp" is trademarked.

The apples went on sale for the first time in late 2019, beginning with a QFC supermarket in University Village, Seattle, on December 1, 2019. Demand subsequently grew by a large margin. By the 2020s, the Cosmic Crisp had become one of the most cultivated and most sold apple varieties in the United States. According to the US Apple Association, the Cosmic Crisp continues to see growth in the American market as of the mid-2020s, as consumer demand continues to favor premium apple varieties. By 2025, enough Cosmic Crisp apple trees have been planted for the variety to be available all year round.

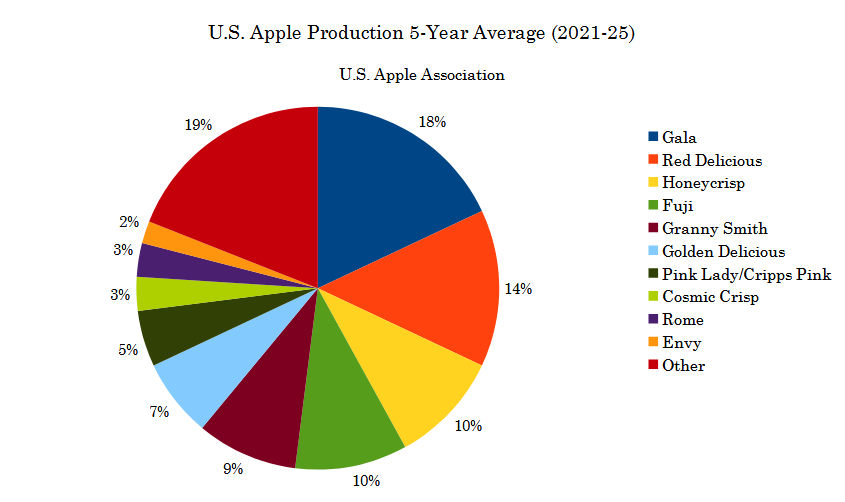
Since its commercial introduction, the Cosmic Crisp has quickly joined the ranks of the ten most-produced apple varieties in the United States.

Outside of the United States, the Cosmic Crisp has seen high sales in Canada, Taiwan, Mexico, and Vietnam; these countries accounted for 96% of all exports of the variety during the 2021–22 crop season. In Mexico, the Cosmic Crisp has seen steady growth in sales despite the enduring popularity of the Red Delicious and expanding market share of the Gala. Cosmic Crisp apples are also sold in Spain, Italy, and Germany, with marketing campaigns aimed at young urban residents.

The cultivar has seen strong and increasing sales since its launch. From 2019 to 2025, production grew by more than 20 times, as measured in 42-pound bushels. It surpassed the McIntosh in US production in 2021. In the 2024–2025 season, the Cosmic Crisp was the sixth most-produced apple variety grown in the United States, comprising 6% of the country's annual production, according to the USApple Association. Some farmers and industry insiders predict that the Cosmic Crisp will soon overtake the Honeycrisp in popularity. Indeed, some orchardists have been making the switch from the Honeycrisp to newer varieties, including the Cosmic Crisp. Growers hope that the Cosmic Crisp will help revitalize the apple industry, which has been facing low demand and prices, as well as rising labor and other costs.

== See also ==
- Crimson Delight, Washington State University's first apple variety, also known as WA 2
- SweeTango (Honeycrisp × Zestar)
- EverCrisp (Honeycrisp × Fuji)
- SugarBee (Honeycrisp × unknown)
- Sunflare (Honeycrisp × Pink Lady), also known as WA 64
