= Apple Rankings =

American apple-ranking website

- Available in: English
- Founded: 2016
- Creator: Brian Frange
- Website: applerankings.com

Apple Rankings is a website and former Tumblr blog run by Brian "The Appleist" Frange, a TV writer, comedian and animator from New York. The website uses an "F100 rating scale" to rank varieties of apples, featuring blurbs described as "wildly opinionated" by the New York Times. As of 2024, the site had ranked 69 apple varieties.

== History ==
In 2016, Frange bought a SweeTango apple at a Whole Foods store in New York. He tried the apple, and has said that he "felt betrayed that apples like the SweeTango could exist, and I was being forced to eat trash." He has stated that after this experience, he "vowed to spread the word about different varieties of apples." Prior to this point, Frange's favorite fruit was "probably a grape or a mango." He has said that until 2015, he was not a fan of apples; "I would pick up a Red Delicious and it would be a mealy disgrace. It was like I was in Pleasantville and my whole world was black and white.

Frange thus began Apple Rankings as a blog on the social media website Tumblr. In 2021, Apple Rankings became its own website. On the website, he goes by the name "The Appleist". As of 2024, there were 69 apples ranked on the site, and Frange had over 100 apples that he had tried but had not yet ranked, stating that he was "on a quest to rank as many apples as I humanly can before the day I die, and I hope that when I die, this list of apple rankings can live on and be my legacy." He was living in Culver City, California, and did not have children.

== Rating method and F100 scale ==
Frange usually tries the apples multiple times, believing it to be unfair to rank an apple after only trying it in one season. He buys two batches of the apples, a season apart, to avoid this; he buys five apples, tastes one fresh, and then stores the rest in the refrigerator for a few days, after which he tastes them again. He repeats this process with the second batch two weeks later, also allowing him to avoid bad batches of fruit. He occasionally orders apples directly from orchards, and some orchards have shipped their fruit to him when their new apples have come to market.

He uses a unique rating scale on his website to give scores to the apple types, called the "F100 rating scale", in which 0 is the worst and 100 is the best. This score is influenced by factors such as taste, cost, availability, density, crispiness, and beauty. The website features separate meters for sweetness, tartness, and intensity. Frange does not discount apples based on their russeting, stating that this usually indicates sweetness, and has said this is also the case for lenticels. He prefers apples with more color, usually red.

Apples under 55 points receive the category of "Pure Shit Apples," and those ranked from 0 to 19 points are categorized as "Apple Hell". Further demarcation describes these as "Not Worth Eating," and "Horse Food," for the mid-range, and "Despicable," "Vomitous Filth," and "Criminal Malfeasance," for the lowest. The highest rated apples are given the category "Top Apples." The highest possible rating of 100 is given the title of "The Fabled 'Immaculate Apple'". Categories for baking apples, cider apples, and sour apples exist on Apple Rankings.

He has described the website's comment section as "robust and violent." He has said he is "nervous about lenticels", having received hate mail about his opinions of them. Frange describes them as usually "in on the bit."

== Specific rankings ==
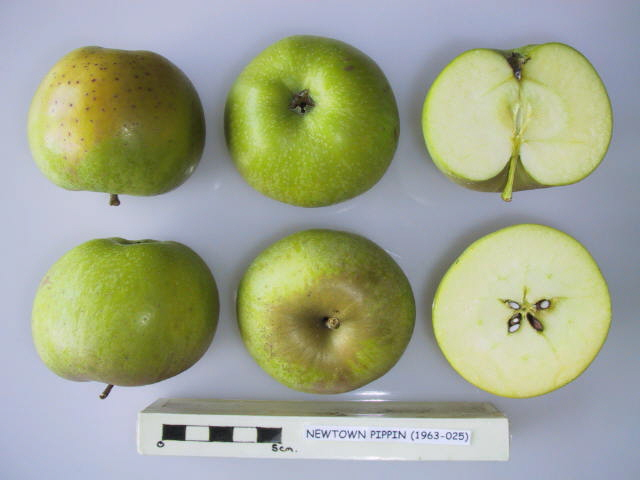
Newtown Pippins are rated the lowest at 19/100, "Long Island's sand-filled condom"

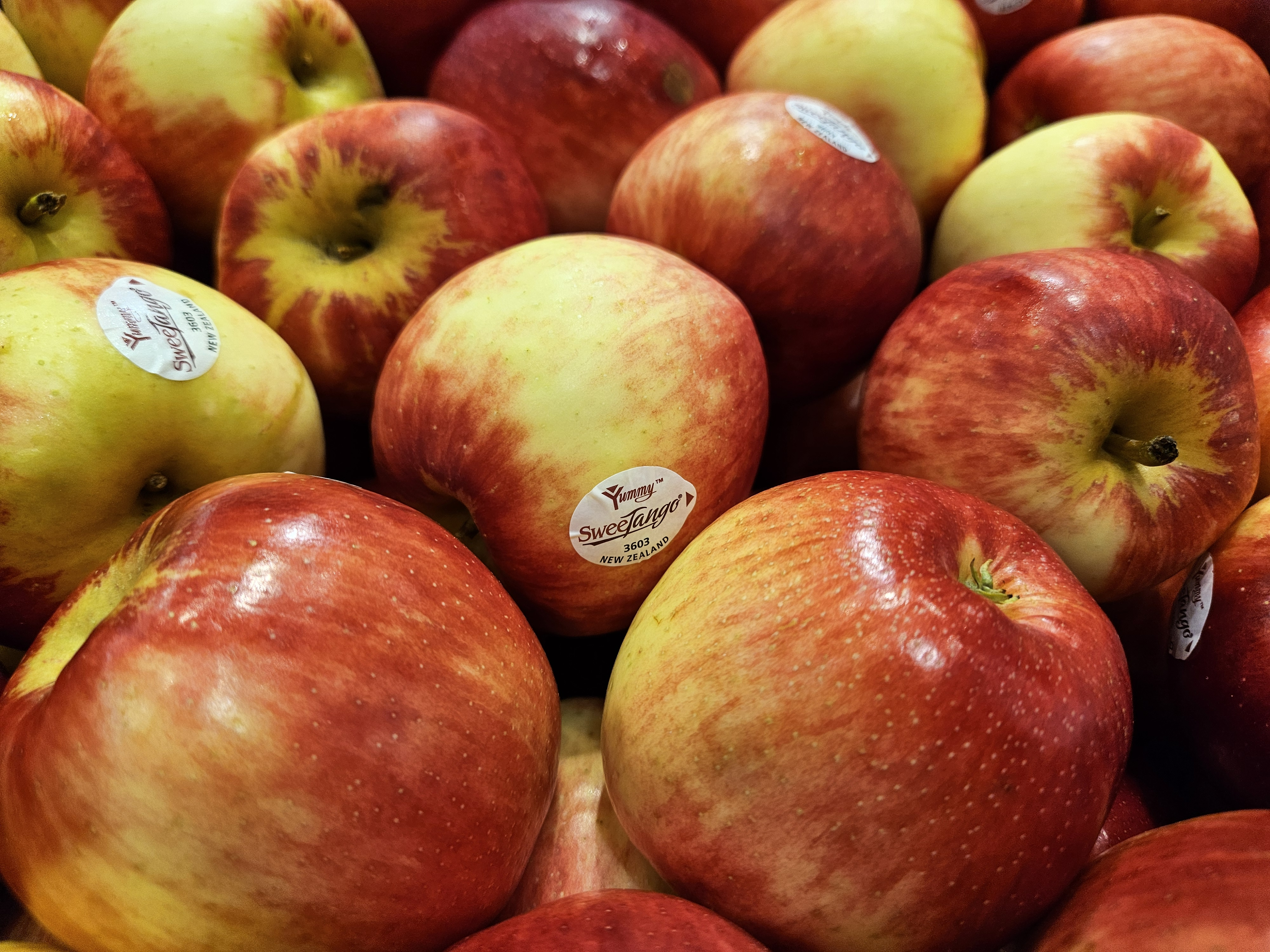
SweeTango apples are rated the highest at 97/100, "The Holy Grail"

As of 2024, Newtown Pippins were the worst-rated apples on the site, with an F100 score of 19/100. Frange described it as "Long Island's sand-filled condom", and "a tasteless hunk of malformed donkey shit that should’ve been abolished during the reign of King George III". Granny Smith apples are rated at 57/100. Frange has given the Hunnyz apple, his "worst named apple of all time," the descriptor "Barely Worth It", having tried it every year since 2021, as of 2024. He initially rated SugarBee apples in the 70s, though his comments later persuaded him to try them again. He raised their score, and later stated that he was "a little biased by the horrific bee mascot." Honeycrisp apples are rated at 95/100, and SweeTango apples are given the title of "The Holy Grail" with the highest score of 97/100.

Additionally, the website names the Cosmic Crisp apple "the most overhyped apple of all time," the SnapDragon a "chomp-worthy newcomer," and the Jonagold "a forgettable college friend."
