= EverCrisp =

Apple cultivar

Malus pumila
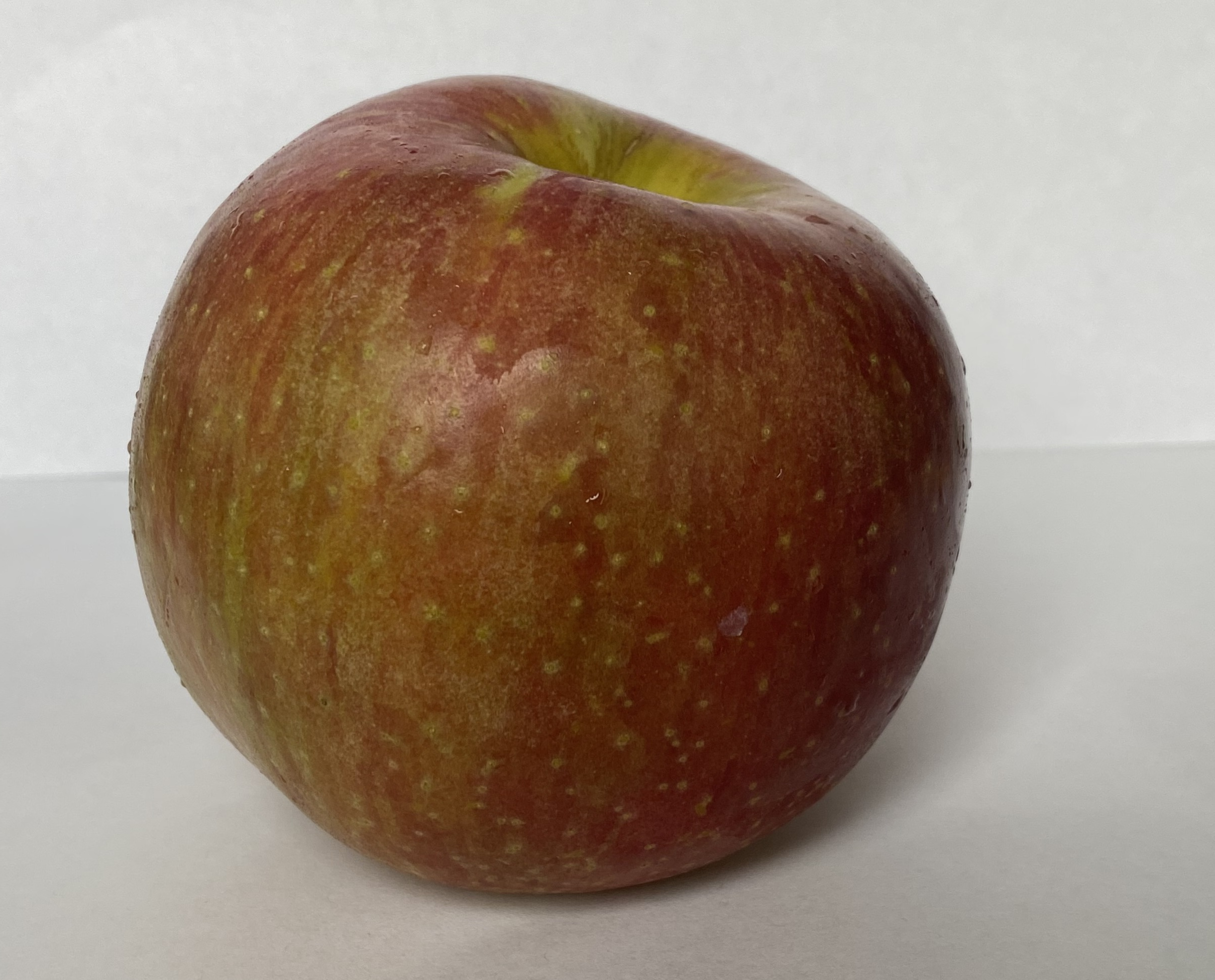
- Genus: Malus
- Species: M. pumila
- Hybrid parentage: Honeycrisp × Fuji
- Cultivar: MAIA-1
- Marketing names: EverCrisp
- Origin: (United States) Pataksala, Ohio, 1998

EverCrisp is the trademarked name of MAIA-1, an American cultivated apple variety or cultivar developed by the Midwest Apple Improvement Association (MAIA). This variety is a cross between the Honeycrisp and the Fuji. Originally produced only in Ohio, the EverCrisp is now cultivated across the United States. The apple entered the public marketplace in 2017, and has seen steadily growing sales since.

== Origins ==
Mitch Lynd of Lynd Fruit Farms in Pataskala, Ohio, developed MAIA-1 during the late 1990s. Lynd crossed the Honeycrisp and the Fuji by pollination and germinated the first seedlings. He then disseminated them to farmers for experimental cultivation and development. In 2007, the first test seedlings began to bear fruit. The initial fruits were selected and evaluated through internal tastings and if successful, external tastings. Results were highly positive. MAIA-1 was soon trademarked as EverCrisp. It is the first fruit variety released by the MAIA.

After almost 20 years of development, EverCrisp became publicly available for purchase late October 2017. It was initially available for sale only in the Midwest and the Northeast. But as of October 2018, EverCrisp is grown in 350 orchards across 32 states. The MAIA estimated by that time, they had planted more than 600,000 EverCrisp trees across the United States since the apple's initial development.

EverCrisp is considered a "club apple" variety, meaning apple growers who want to propagate, harvest, and sell EverCrisp are required to purchase a membership and license. According to Good Fruit Grower magazine, EverCrisp growers need to purchase a US$100 per year membership, a royalty fee of $1 per tree, trademark and logo fees of 20 cents per tree for four to ten years, and 30 cents per tree for eleven to twenty years. Bill Dodd, the president of the MAIA, released a statement on the MAIA's website in 2014 assuring that "no one will be excluded" from buying into the EverCrisp club. "We're not going to limit who has access," Dodd said.

== Cultivation ==
EverCrisp is a late-season apple, ripening in mid-October and harvested in October to November depending on the region. Co-founder of the MAIA Mitch Lynd says that EverCrisp is "more grower friendly" than the Fuji apple, having a higher yield per tree. It is also sturdier than the Honeycrisp.

== Appearance and flavor ==
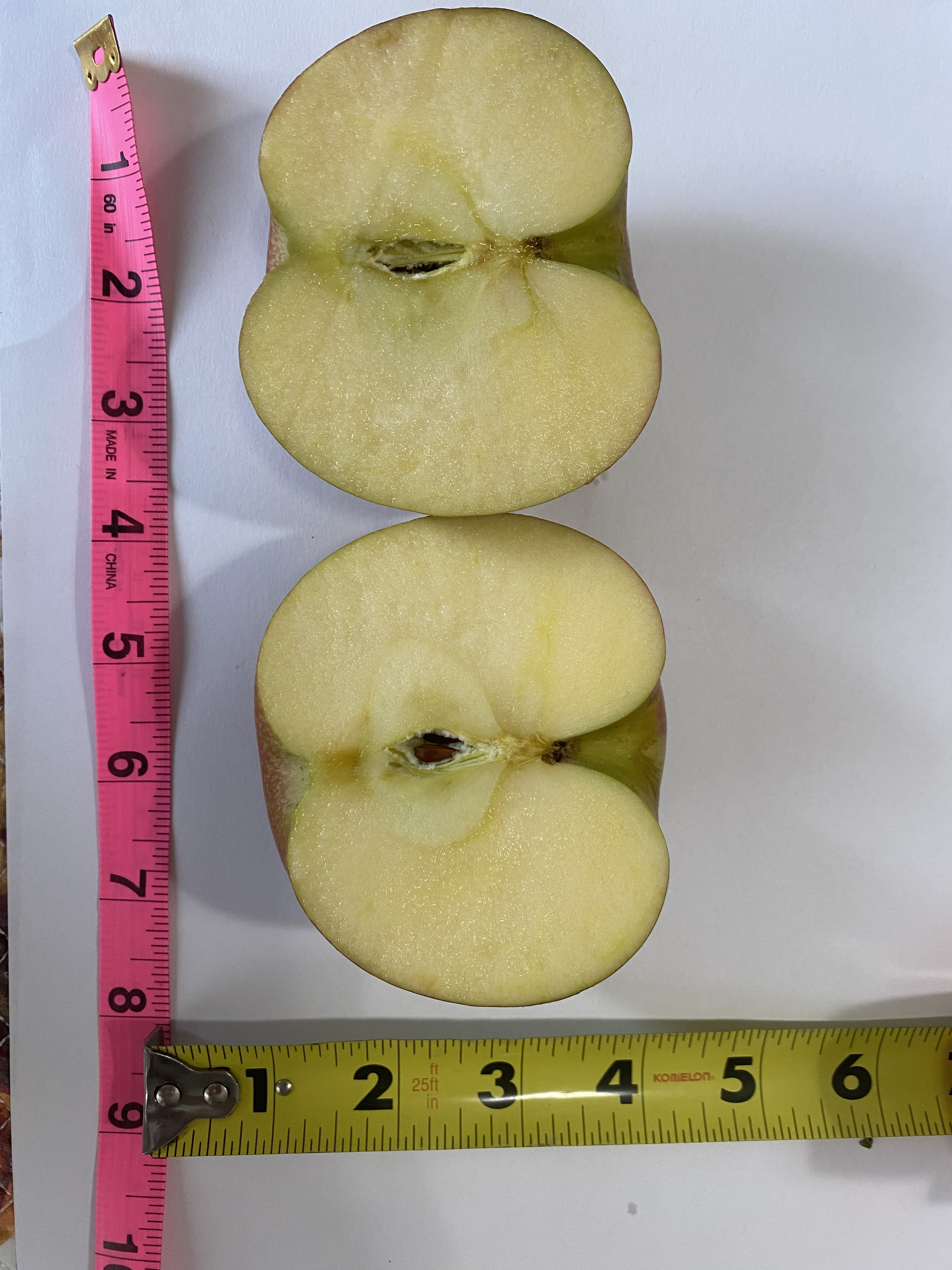
Vertical cross-section

According to its own website, this apple variety is "blushed rosey red over a cream background." Growing Produce notes that while EverCrisp has a texture similar to Honeycrisp, its external shape and appearance most resembles the Fuji apple. The MAIA states EverCrisp has a "slightly harder" exterior than Honeycrisp. Dave Rennhack of Rannhack Orchards Market testified to this variety's shelf life: "The apple eats even better after two or three months in the cooler. The flavor mellows out a bit and the coloration turns from an underlying green cast to pineapple gold, making the apple very appealing." Bill Dodd, president of the MAIA, observed that EverCrisp has the long storage time of Fuji with the lasting crunch of Honeycrisp. "EverCrisp can last on the counter for two weeks where the Honeycrisp will start losing quality," he said.

The EverCrisp apple variety is sweet, crisp, firm, and dense just like its parent cultivar the Honeycrisp. Director for floral and produce at Tops Friendly Markets, Jeff Cady, describes this variety as having a strong Honeycrisp flavor with a distinct Fuji-like tang. A panel of taste-testers at Bloomberg said EverCrisp had an "in-your-face candied-apple sweetness, with a background tang and monstrous crunch."

Being resistant to browning, the EverCrisp is also suitable for charcuterie boards or salads.

== Reception ==
The EverCrisp has been largely well-received by apple growers in the Midwest. In an interview with Good Fruit Grower magazine, Bear Mountain Orchards owner John Lott expressed his opinion regarding the MAIA's management of EverCrisp. "It's being marketed as a variety by growers at every level," Lott said, "[It's] not branded in a box like most club varieties." Bruce Hollabaugh, wholesale apple distributor in Pennsylvania, commends the MAIA's approach to managing EverCrisp as an inclusive club apple. "It's refreshing to see guys like us, a grassroots organization of growers, that's trying to make apples better for the right reasons." In late-2018, Brain Garwood of Garwood Orchards said "EverCrisp is a great apple for us as it continues to bring people to the orchard," Promoters say EverCrisp is enjoying a rapid increase in activity among fruit farmers, partly because the fruit is said to lack the problems of thin skin and tree disease susceptibility that allegedly plague the popular Honeycrisp parent.

This positive sentiment has followed through with independent and wholesale distributors. In an interview with The Produce News in March 2019, Ward Dobbins of United Apple Sales said EverCrisp's quality has gotten "even stronger as [the] trees mature." Dobbins says this has enabled him to "work closely with retail partners in providing supply assurance to give them a true apple advantage late in the season." Vinnie Latessa, director of produce for Heinen's Grocery Store, says that "EverCrisp is rivaling sales of Honeycrisp [and is] a close second in our lineup of apples from a sales and volume standpoint." Scott Swindeman, co-owner of Applewood Orchards in Michigan, said that his supply of fruit from EverCrisp trees has increased by approximately 25 percent since his harvest in 2017.

According to a consumer study conducted in November 2010 by Diane Miller, tree fruit Extension specialist at Ohio State University, EverCrisp "rated higher than Fuji and Cameo and was equivalent to Honeycrisp and SweeTango." The MAIA is optimistic that "once people try EverCrisp, they will come back for more."

At pick-your-own orchards, this variety and other Honeycrisp descendants, such as the Rosalee (a full sibling of the EverCrisp), are popular among customers.
