= MN55 (apple) =

Apple cultivar

Malus domestica
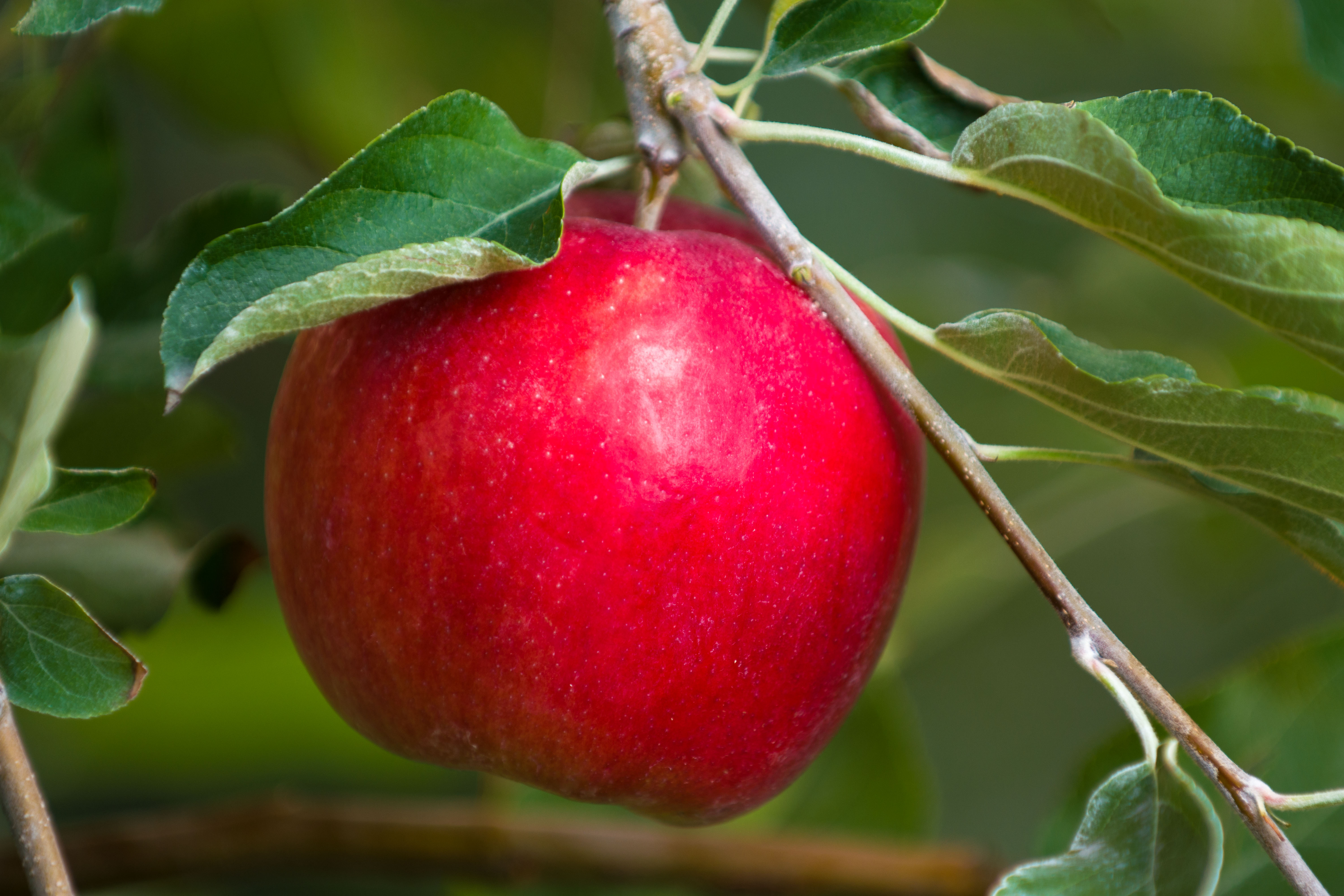
- Genus: Malus
- Species: Malus domestica
- Hybrid parentage: Honeycrisp and AA44
- Cultivar: MN55
- Marketing names: Rave®, First Kiss®
- Origin: (United States) Excelsior, Minnesota, 1997

The MN55 cultivated variety or cultivar of apple developed by David Bedford, a senior pomologist at the University of Minnesota's apple-breeding program, and James Luby, PhD, professor, Department of Horticultural Sciences, Horticultural Research Center, is a cross between Honeycrisp and MonArk (AA44), a non-patented apple variety grown in Arkansas.

The MN55 cultivar apple was originally developed in 1997 through natural cross-pollination. David Bedford and the team at the University of Minnesota also developed the popular Honeycrisp apple and its successor, the SweeTango-brand Minneiska apple.

The MN55 fruit is grown and sold under the licensed brand names, Rave and First Kiss. The quality of MN55 fruit is dependent upon climate, grower sites and production practices. To insure consistency in fruit quality the University of Minnesota limits the license of MN55. Outside Minnesota, MN55 is licensed to Stemilt Growers under the Rave brand. Minnesota commercial growers grow and sell the fruit under the brand name, First Kiss.

== Characteristics ==
The MN55 produces early ripening fruit that are ready to pick in July. Medium to large in size, and globose-conical in shape, the apples have a crisp, juicy texture, and are similar in flavor to Honeycrisp. Its Monark parentage contributes to its quick ripening, its mostly dark red color, and long storage life.

== Uses ==
Rave and First Kiss apples are intended for eating. Baking is not recommended, as the flesh is so delicate it falls apart.

== Development and characteristics ==
- MN55 is crossbred without using genetically modified organisms (GMOs). This is a difficult task and took Bedford and Luby more than 14,000 tries.
- From crossbreeding MN55 to producing the first commercial Rave apple took 20 years.
- MN55 fruit fall off the tree before harvesting, so need to be monitored closely.

== Timeline ==
- 1997 – First seedling tree selected at a research center located near Lake Minnetonka in Excelsior, Minnesota.
- 1998 - Asexual propagation succeeds
- 2014 – United States patent PP26,412 filed
- 2014 – Licensed to Stemilt Growers
- 2017 – Stemilt releases Rave apple
- 2018 – University of Minnesota Introduces First Kiss apple
