= Ralls Janet =

Apple cultivar

Malus domestica
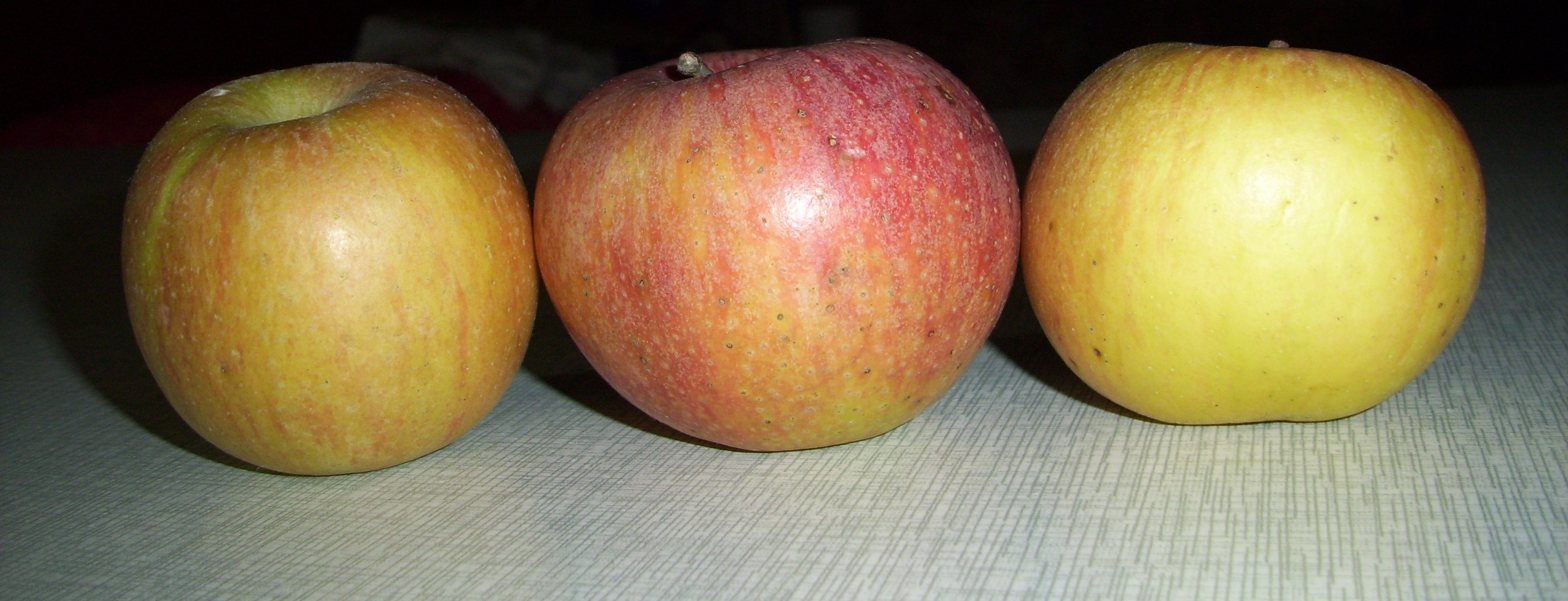
- Species: Malus domestica
- Cultivar: Ralls Janet
- Marketing names: Kokko; Neverfail; Ralls Genet; and others
- Origin: (United States) Amherst County, Virginia, 1785

Ralls Janet is a cultivated variety or cultivar of apple also known by many other names. It has been used extensively in modern apple breeding, and has several commercially important offspring, notably the Fuji. It was grown by Thomas Jefferson, one of the Founding Fathers of the United States, at his primary residence, Monticello. It should not be confused with a largely red apple named Ralls found in New England and the Upper Midwestern United States.

The origins of the Ralls Janet remains unclear. Its namesake is reportedly Edmond-Charles Genet, a French minister who gave cuttings to Jefferson, who then passed them on to Virginia nurseryman Caleb Ralls. Another possibility is that Jefferson received this variety from a local nurseryman named Ralls, who lived across the James River from his summer home, Poplar Forest.In 1871, Dr. William Howsley reported that Caleb Rawles [sic] introduced the variety in 1795 as the Genet Apple.

The Ralls Janet is a medium variety with oblate geometry. It has greenish yellow skin, which is mottled and streaked with shades of red and pink. There may be some russetting near the stem. It blooms comparatively late, making it known as the Neverfail in central Virginia.

The Ralls Janet has dense, crisp, and yellowish flesh, a tart-sweet flavor, and a sweet aroma when cut. It is suitable for dessert and for making apple pie, apple butter, and apple cider.

This variety is highly susceptible to blossom fireblight and somewhat vulnerable to apple scab and bitter rot. But it is highly resistant to collar rot.
