= Sunflare (apple) =

Apple cultivar

- Genus: Malus
- Species: Malus domestica
- Hybrid parentage: Honeycrisp × Cripps Pink
- Cultivar: WA 64
- Breeder: Washington State University
- Origin: (United States) Wenatchee, Washington, 1998

Sunflare is the commercial name of the apple variety WA 64, developed at Washington State University (WSU). It is a Honeycrisp crossed with Cripps Pink/Pink Lady apple. Apple breeders at WSU began searching for a commercially viable hybrid of the aforementioned varieties in 1998, initially planting tens of thousands of seeds before selecting the best one in 2023. The first WA 64 apples were planted at WSU's Sunrise Research Farm in Rock Island and the Stemilt Growers orchard in Quincy, Washington in 2015. The Sunflare will become available to farmers starting 2026. WSU faculty and students were given the opportunity to taste the new variety that same year. It will be exclusively grown in Washington state for at least a decade. It is scheduled to become available at grocery stores in 2029.

The Sunflare inherits its crispness and juiciness from the Honeycrisp, and its taste and firmness from the Cripps Pink. It has yellow orange or yellow skin with a pink blush, with visible lenticels. These traits could help it stand out in a market full of red and bi-color varieties. The Sunflare is a sweet and tart apple, small to medium in size. Its sweetness and tartness are between those of its parents. The Sunflare is not as hard as the Cripps Pink, but is juicier and crisper. This variety is resistant to bruising and can be kept in controlled-atmosphere storage for nine to twelve months. It is not too susceptible to bitter pit, but is mildly vulnerable to mildew, necrosis, and oxidative stress (sunburn). Its harvest time is earlier than most other varieties. In Washington state, the Sunflare is harvested at the same time as the Golden Delicious and two weeks before the Cosmic Crisp (WA 38).

WSU sponsored a naming contest for the apple, promising a gift box of WA 64 apples, Cougar Gold cheese, and other university merchandise to the winner. In December 2024, the name Sunflare was chosen from some 15,000 applications. The name was inspired by the similarity between the appearance of the apple and the May 2024 solar storms that caused the aurora borealis to become visible across North America.
