= MN55 =

MN55 may refer to one of the following:

- Minnesota State Highway 55
- MN55 (apple) cultivar developed at University of Minnesota
