= Zestar apple =

Apple cultivar

Zestar! apple
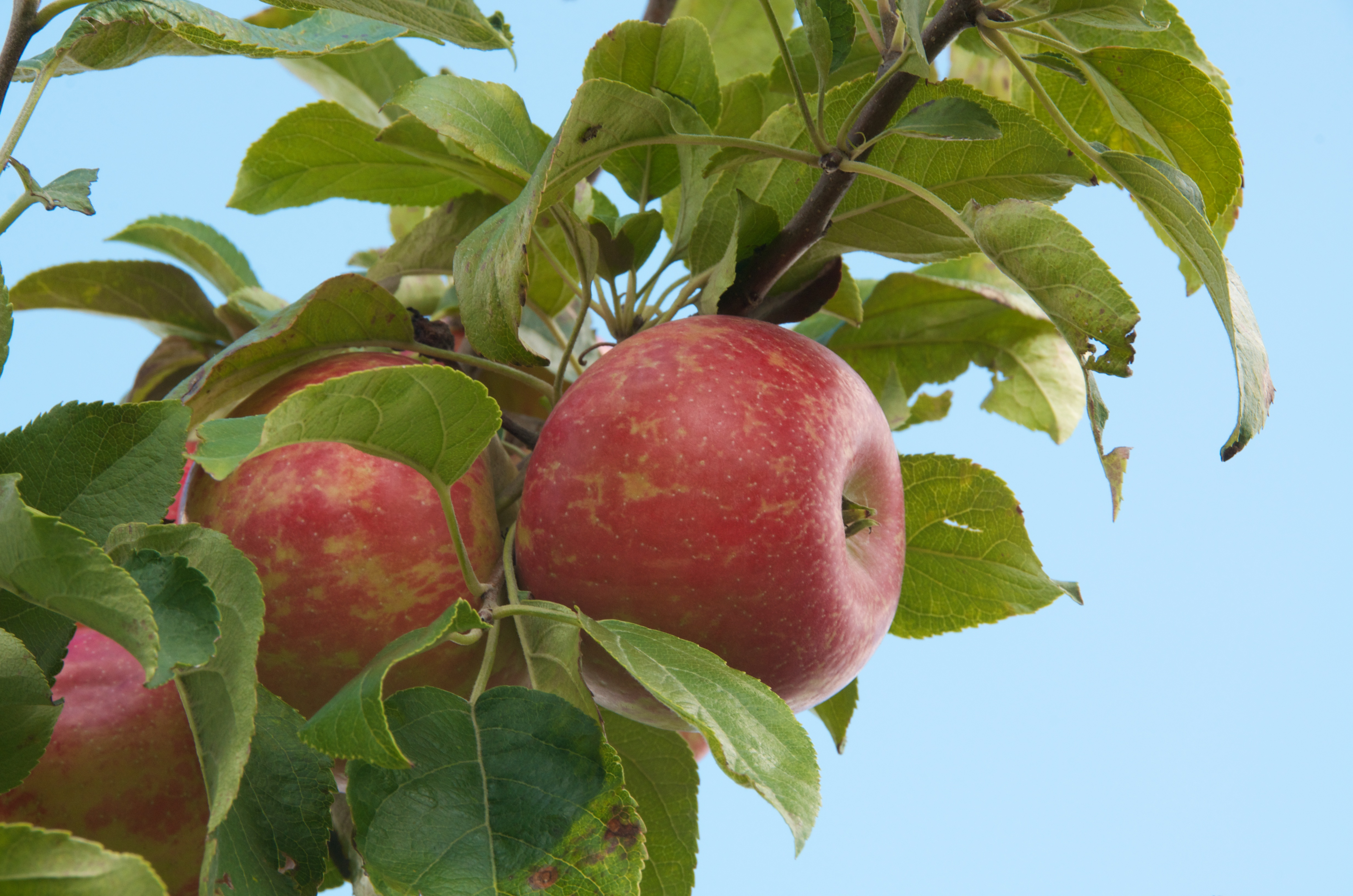
- Genus: Malus
- Species: Malus domestica
- Hybrid parentage: State Fair × MN 1691
- Cultivar: Minnewashta
- Origin: University of Minnesota, 1999

The Zestar! apple (trade mark) or Minnewashta (cultivar) is an apple cultivar released in 1999. It was developed by the horticulturalists at the University of Minnesota Landscape Arboretum's Horticultural Resource Center, at the University of Minnesota.

The Minnewashta apple is known for its earlier ripening season, ripening in late August through September, marking an earlier start to the apple growing season in Minnesota. The Minnewasheta trees were subject to cold climate testing in laboratories to ensure that the fruit is capable of growing in northern climates.

== Breeding ==
Breeders of the Minnewashta apple have been working at developing apples since breeding attempts began in 1878, and have developed at least 24 new apple cultivars, including the Haralson, Fireside (and Connell Red), Honeygold, Regent, Sweet 16, Honeycrisp, and SnowSweet. Zestar! is the product of a hybridization of State Fair × MN 1691. Prior to the development of Minnewashta, breeders considered early-ripening apples to be weak and subpar, describing them as soft, having poor shelf life, and having varying degrees of flavor.

In 2010 a further apple cultivar, Minneiska (brand name SweeTango), was bred using Zestar! and Honeycrisp as parents. This variety is said to have a super crunch.

== Description ==
The Minnewashta apple tends to be round with an average diameter of three inches, and tastes crispy and light. About 60-80% of the apple's skin turns a deep red hue as a result of exposure to sunlight during maturation, the remaining areas of the skin remaining a yellow or greenish color. The apple tastes sweet and tangy, with accents of brown sugar, and is known for its unique flavor. The apple is best used for fresh eating, and for use in a variety of baked goods, sauces, desserts, and salads. The fruit can be well paired with foods such as walnuts, cinnamon, cheddar cheeses, and brown sugar. The apple is praised for its shelf life and can be stored up for two months with or without refrigeration.

== Marketing ==
Zestar! has increased the market availability for apples in the Midwest. The Zestar! apple is protected under the US Plant Patent #97120.

In common with other apples developed by the university, Zestar! is a registered trademark and can only be grown as a "managed variety". Growers must be licensed to a university-approved co-operative and follow strict growing, harvesting and shipping methods.
