= Fuji (apple) =

Apple cultivar

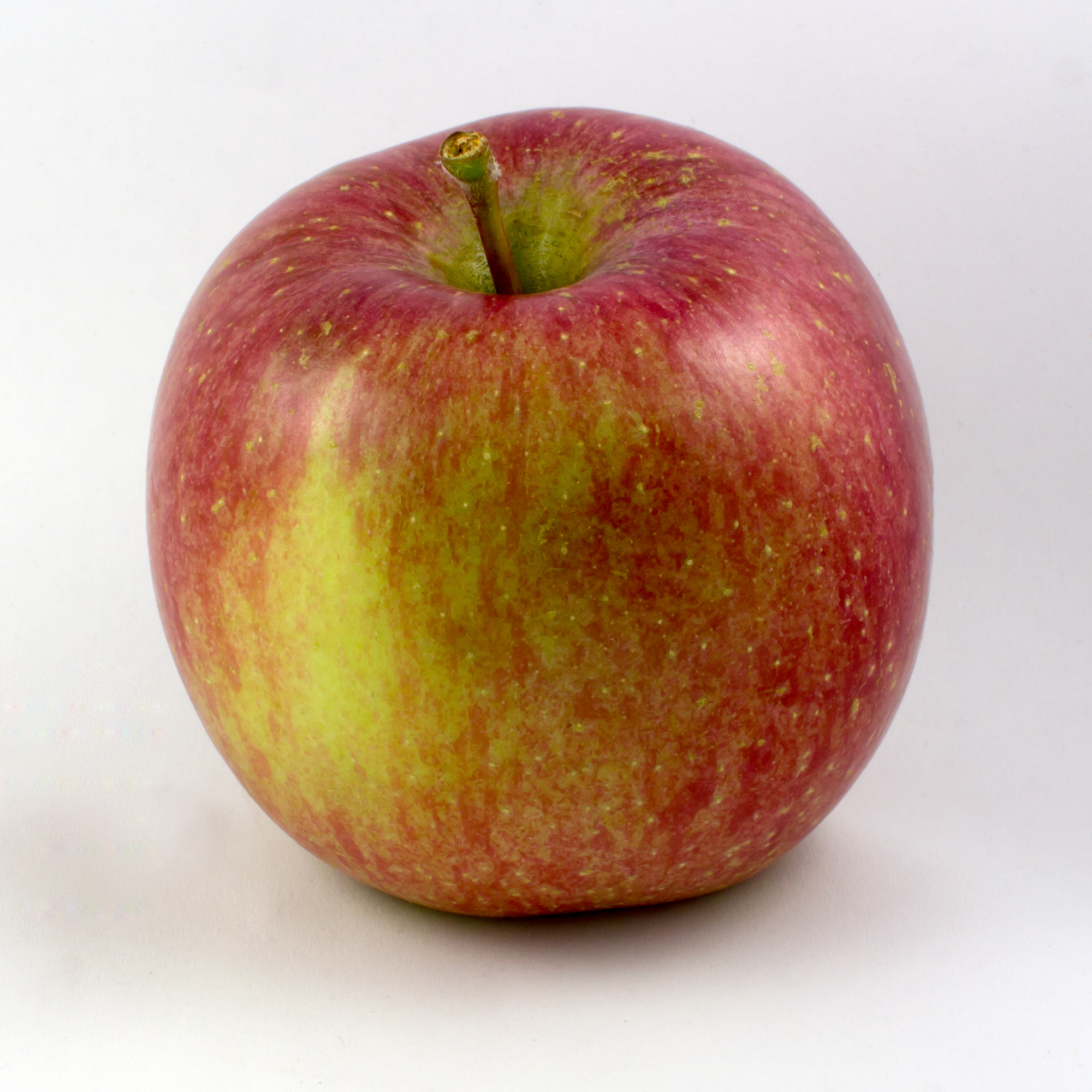
- Species: Malus domestica
- Hybrid parentage: Red Delicious × Ralls Janet
- Cultivar: Fuji
- Origin: (Japan) Fujisaki, Aomori, 1939

The Fuji apple (Japanese: ふじ, Hepburn: Fuji) is an apple cultivar developed by growers at the Tōhoku Research Station of the Ministry of Agriculture and Forestry (農林省園芸試験場東北支場, Nōrinshō engei shikenjō Tōhoku-shijō) in Fujisaki, Aomori, Japan, in 1939. It originated as a cross between two American apple varieties—the Red Delicious and Ralls Janet (sometimes called "Rawls Jennet") apples.

The Fuji was named and brought to market in 1962; its name is derived from the first part of the town where it was developed: Fujisaki. Its flavor is sweet and its texture is crisp. It can be used to make apple sauce. According to the US Apple Association website, it is one of the nine most popular apple cultivars in the United States.

== Characteristics ==
Fuji apples are typically round and range from large to very large, averaging 75 millimetres (3.0 in) in diameter. They contain from 9–11% sugars by weight and have a dense flesh that is sweeter and crisper than many other apple cultivars, making them popular with consumers around the world. Fuji apples also have a very long shelf life compared to other apples, even without refrigeration. With refrigeration, Fuji apples can remain fresh for up to a year.

The Fuji thrives in areas with relatively warm summers. A late-season variety, the Fuji ripens after the McIntosh, Gala, and Honeycrisp, but at the same time as the Empire, Red Delicious, and EverCrisp.

== Popularity ==
In Japan, Fuji apples continue to be an unrivaled best-seller. and Japan's apple imports remain low. Aomori Prefecture, home of the Fuji apple, is the best known apple growing region of Japan. Of the roughly 900,000 tons of Japanese apples produced annually, 500,000 tons come from Aomori.

Outside Japan, the popularity of Fuji apples continues to grow. In 2016 and 2017, Fuji apples accounted for nearly 70% of China's 43 million tons grown. The Fuji has been a market success in North America since its debut there in the late twentieth century. As of 2024, the Fuji ranked fifth among the most popular apple varieties in the United States, behind only the Gala, Red Delicious, Granny Smith, and Honeycrisp. It is also one of the top varieties in Canada, alongside the Ambrosia, Gala, and Honeycrisp. In Canada, the Fuji is grown in Ontario and British Columbia. However, while demand for this apple in British Columbia remains stable, farmers there face increasing competition from China. In the United States, most Fuji apples are grown Washington State, Michigan, New York, Pennsylvania, and Oregon. However, by 2025, the Fuji dropped to sixth place in Washington State, overtaken by the Cosmic Crisp. In the United States and Canada, the price look-up codes for Fuji apples are 4129 for small, 4131 for large.

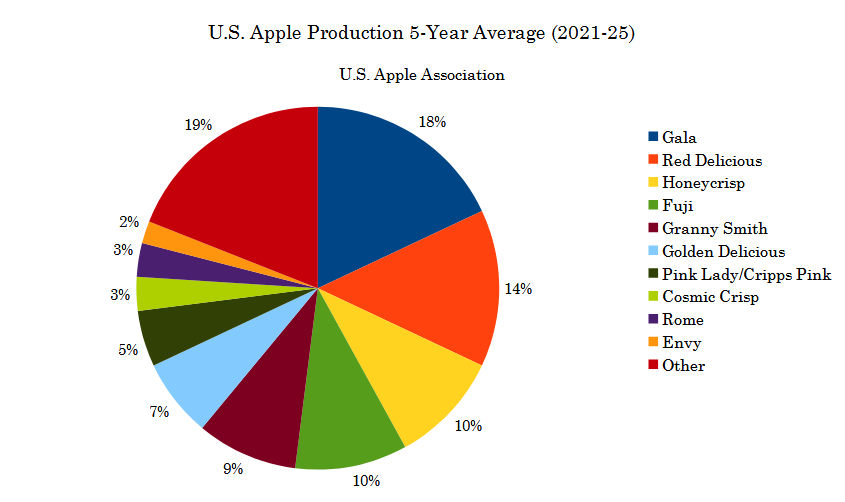
Decades after its introduction, the Fuji remains one of the top apple varieties in the United States.

In Brazil, the Gala and Fuji together commanded 95 percent of the apple market in the middle 2020s.

== Gallery ==
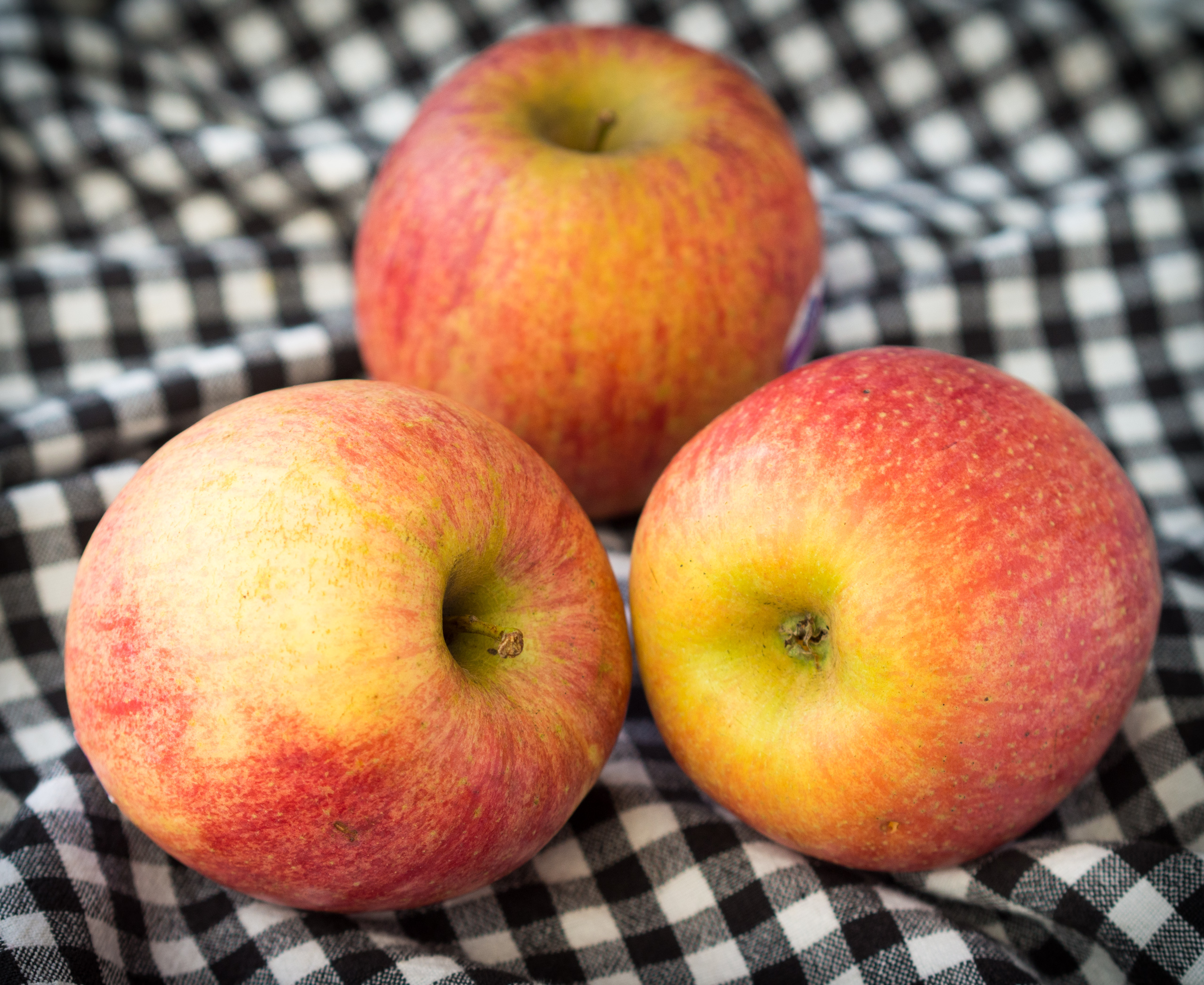
Fuji apples

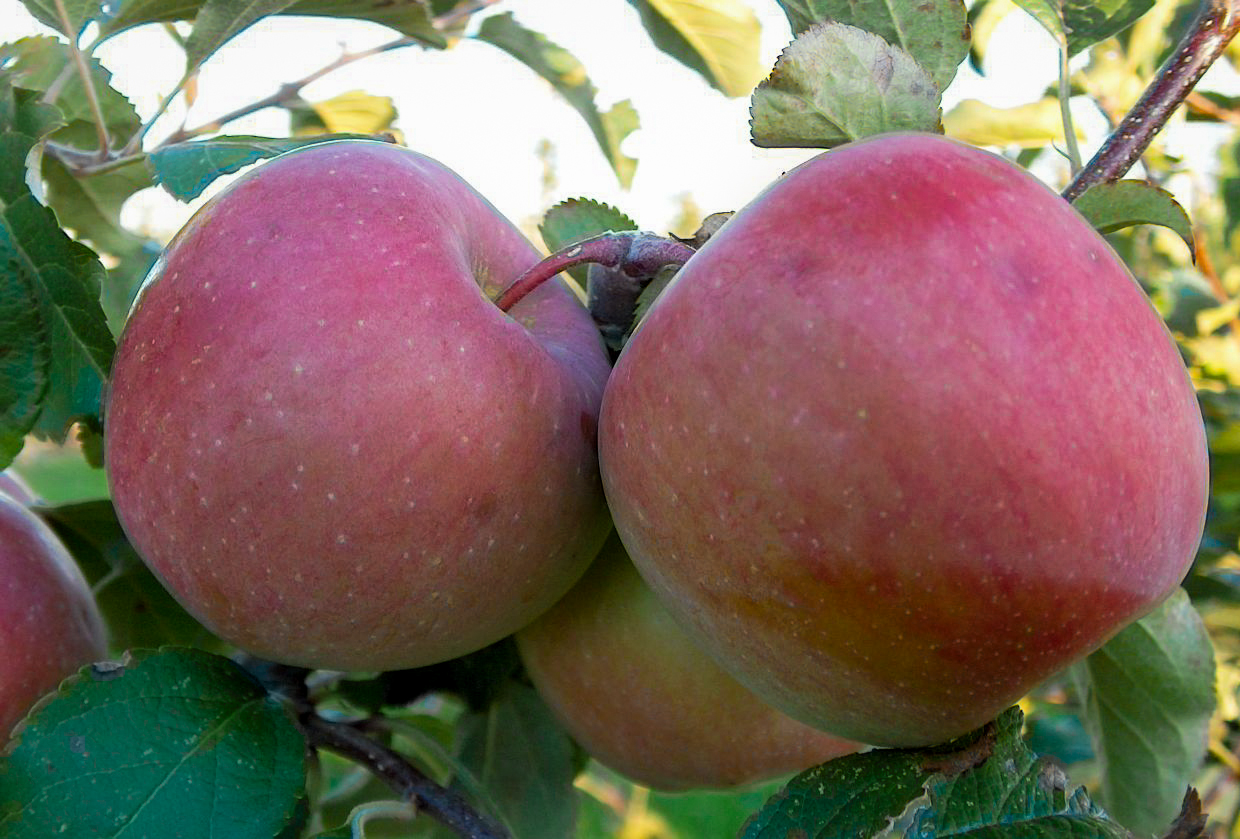
Fuji Kiku on a tree

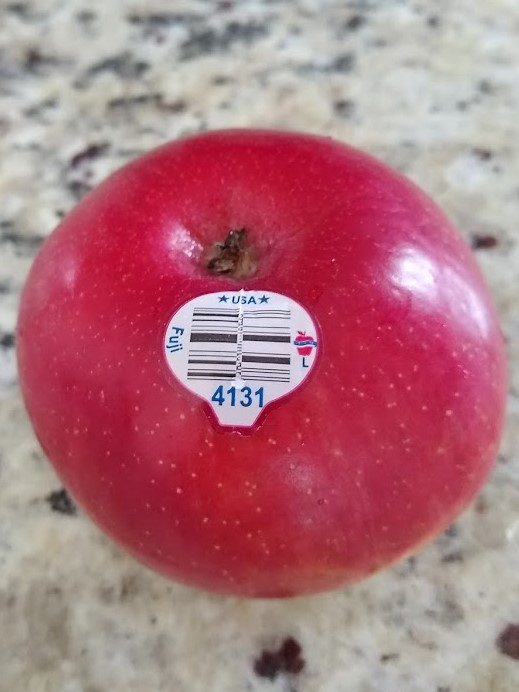
A Fuji apple with a United States PLU code attached

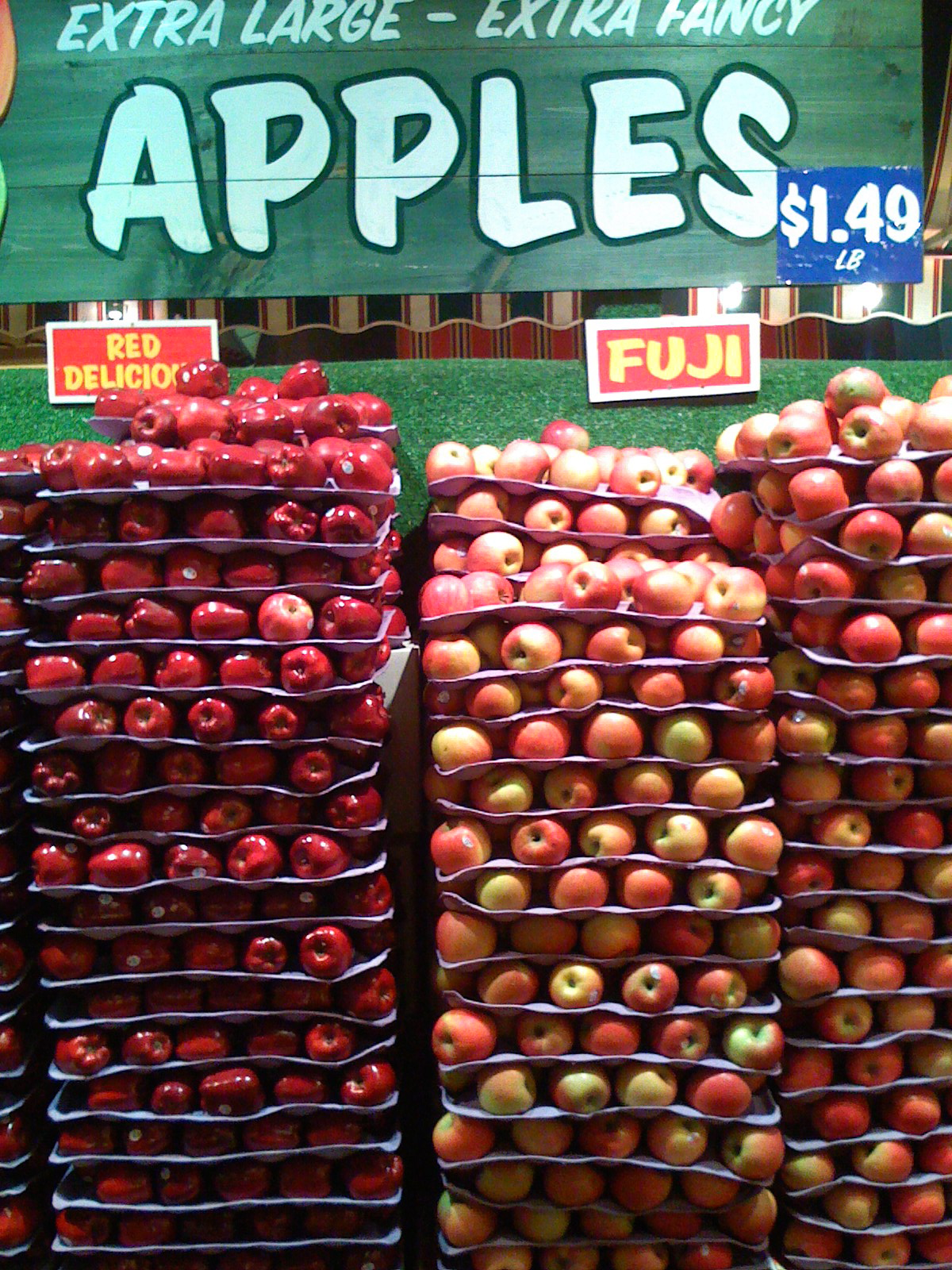
Fuji apples on a display in a supermarket

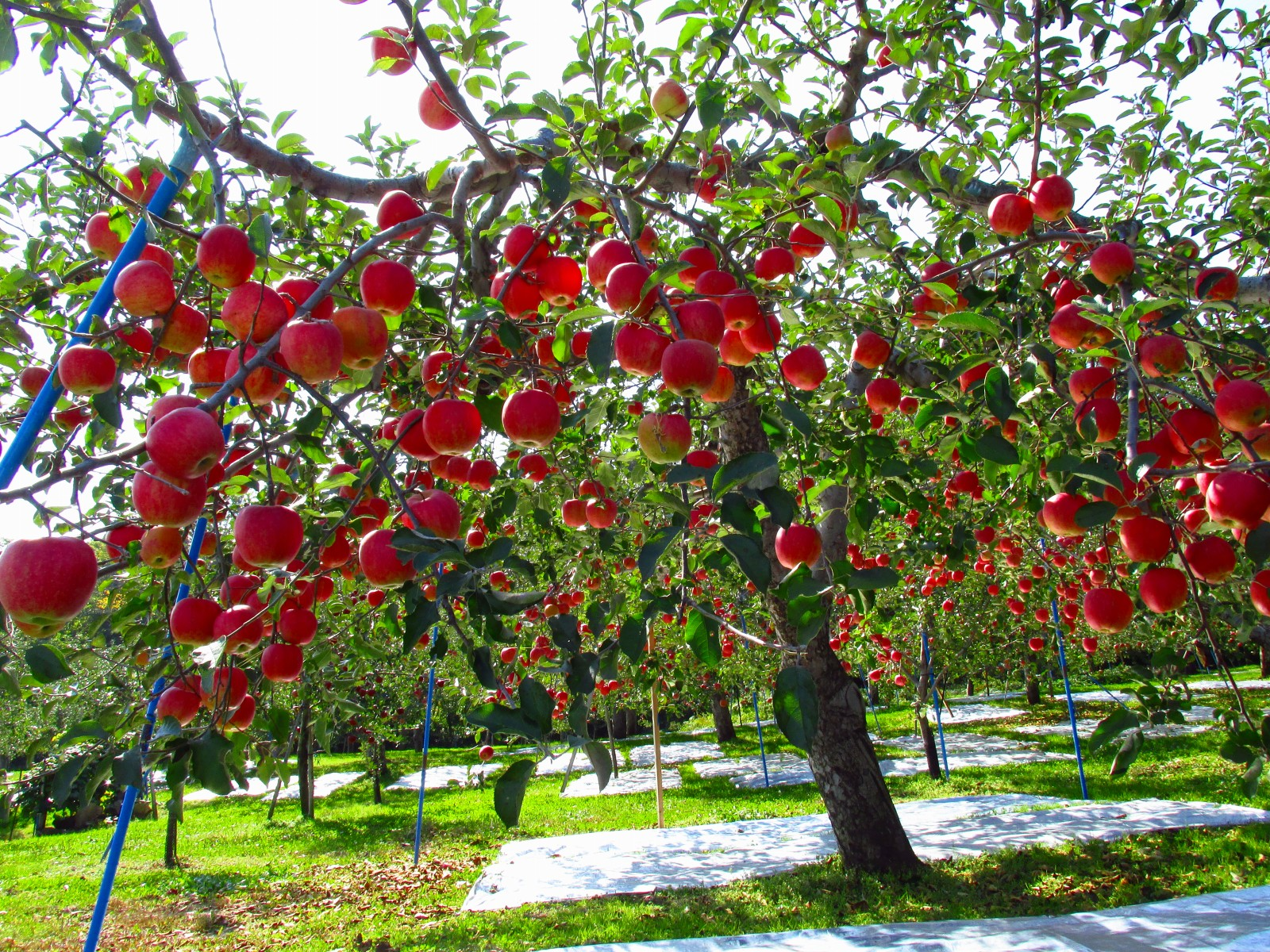
A Fuji apple tree in Iwaki, Hirosaki City, Aomori Prefecture, Japan.

== Mutant cultivars ==
Many sports (mutant cultivars) of the Fuji apple have been recognized and propagated. In addition to those that have remained unpatented, twenty had received US plant patents by August 2008:

Date	"Inventor"	Marketed as	Mutated from	Assignee	Habit	Pattern	Earlier	Color	Plant patent number
Aug 29, 1989	Hiraragi	Yataka	Fuji	Makoto Okada	standard	stripe	1 Month	–	US plant patent 7001
Oct 6, 1992	Yahagi	Heisei Fuji, Beni Shogun^{9645}	Yataka^{7001}	Nakajima Tenkoen	standard	solid	no	dark red	US plant patent 7997
Nov 17, 1992	Cooper	T.A.C.#114	Redsport Type 2	T.A.C.	spur	stripe	10–14 days	more brilliant red, 80—90%	US plant patent 8032
Sep 26, 1995	Fukuda	Tensei	Fuji	Fukushima Tenkoen	standard, larger	stripe	no	same	US plant patent 9298
Apr 16, 1996	Lynd	Fuji-Spike	Fuji	Lynd	spur	stripe	0–5 days	same	US plant patent 9508
Sep 24, 1996	Van Leuven	Myra	unknown red strain	C & O	standard	blush w/ subtle stripe	1 week	bright pink	US plant patent 9645
Dec 9, 1997	Auvil	Fuji 216	T.A.C.#114^{8032}	Auvil	standard	blush	5–21 days	brighter red, 90—100%	US plant patent 10141
Mar 24, 1998	Coopr & Perkins	Fuji Compact T.A.C. #114	T.A.C.#114^{8032}	T.A.C.	spur	same	same	same	US plant patent 10291
Jan 25, 2000	Van Leuven	Fiero	Yataka^{7001}	C & O	standard	indistinct stripe	7–10 days	more intense blush	US plant patent 11193
Sep 18, 2001	Snyder	Snyder	BC 2	Snyder	semi-spur	heavy stripe	same	same	US plant patent 12098
Nov 27, 2001	Torres	Triple E	BC 2	–	standard	85—100% blush	10–14 days	solid red	US plant patent 12219
Apr 16, 2002	Rankin	Rankin Red	Yakata^{7001}	Twin Springs Fruit Farm	standard	70—90% blush	5 days	more intense	US plant patent 12551
Nov. 11, 2003	Teague	Irene	BC 2	–	standard	solid	60 days	yellow	US plant patent 14299
Oct 26, 2004	Braun	Brak	Fuji	Kiku	standard	striped	earlier	ruby red	US plant patent 15261
Feb 21, 2006	Clevenger	Fugachee	Fuji	–	standard	70—90% blush	14 days before Fiero	–	US plant patent 16270
Jun 6, 2006	Banning	Banning Red	Desert Rose Fuji	Banning	standard	stripe	–	redder	US plant patent 16624
Aug 14, 2007	Lee, Edwards, Delugar	CABp	Nagafu 6	CABp 4	standard	stripe	–	"superior"	US plant patent 17914
Sep 11, 2007	Eppich	Eppich 2	T.A.C. #114^{8032}	–	standard	blush with light stripe	unclear	yellow and red	US plant patent 18004
Apr 29, 2008	Braun	Fuji Fubrax	Fuji	Kiku SRL	standard	dark ruby red stripes and blush	late	green-yellow	US plant patent 18761
Jul 29, 2008	Leis, Mazzola	Fujiko	Nagafu 12	Consorzio Italiano Vivaisti	standard	diffused	–	more intense red	US plant patent 19054

Unpatented Fuji mutants include:

- BC 2
- Desert Rose Fuji
- Nagafu 2
- Nagafu 6
- Nagafu 12
- Redsport Type 1
- Redsport Type 2

== Descendant cultivars ==
- Autumn Glory: Fuji × Golden Delicious
- EverCrisp: Fuji × Honeycrisp
- Hokuto: Fuji × Mutsu

== See also ==
- Grāpple — a Concord grape-flavor-infused Fuji apple
- Sekai Ichi
- Tsugaru (apple)
