= Autumn Glory =

Apple cultivar

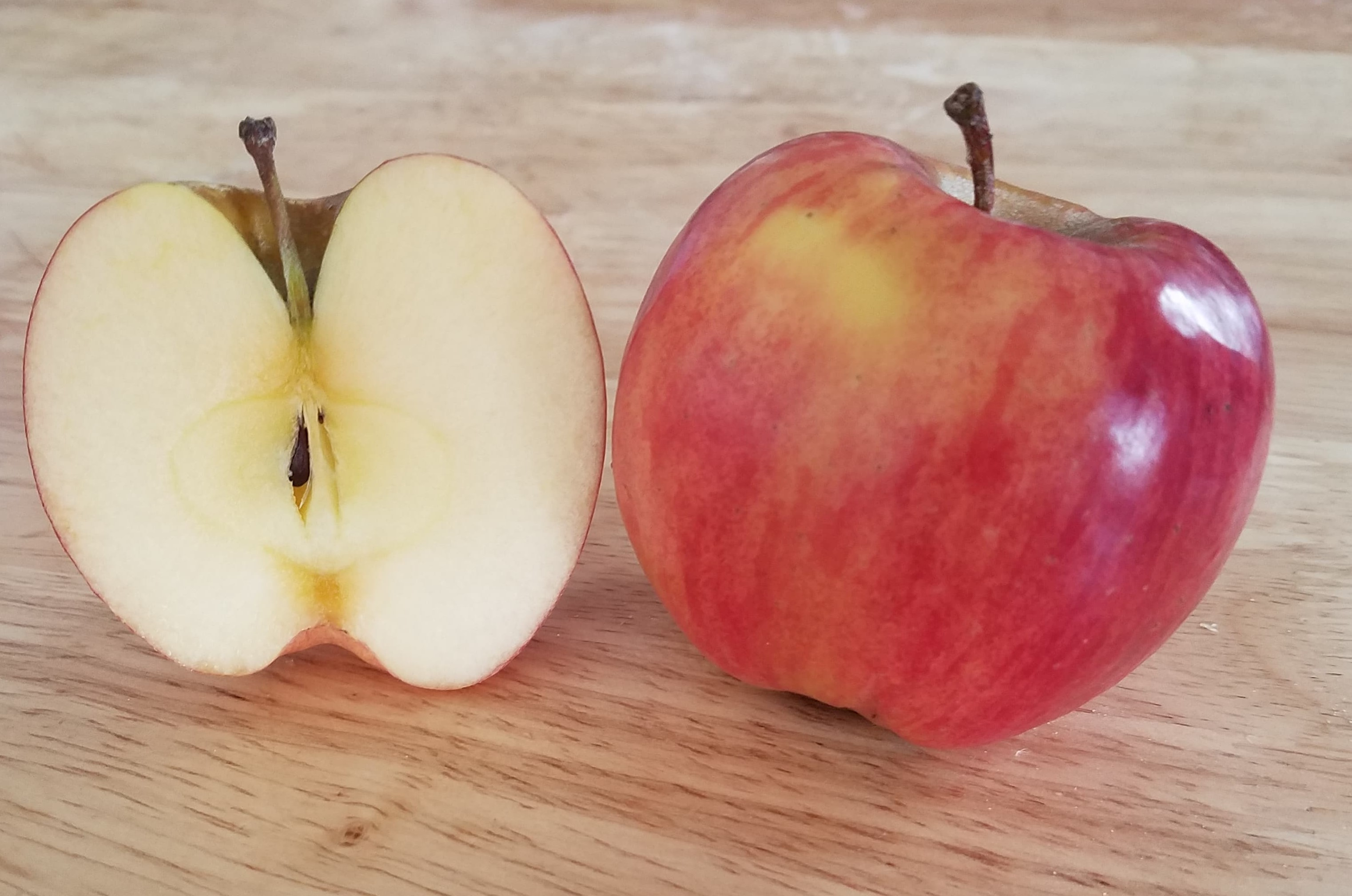
- Species: Malus domestica
- Hybrid parentage: Fuji × Golden Delicious
- Cultivar: Autumn Glory
- Breeder: Yu Lin Wang
- Origin: (United States) Washington State, 1976

Autumn Glory is an American cultivated variety of apple. It is a hybrid of the Fuji and Golden Delicious, cross-pollinated by Dr. Yu Lin Wang in 1976. It was developed in Washington State and commercially released in 2011.

Domex Superfresh Growers purchased the rights to this variety in 2011 and began selling it at select locations along the West Coast of the United States. Since then, production has expanded to other parts of the country.

Autumn Glory apples are described to feature a stronger and sweeter apple flavor with a hint of cinnamon. and it is harvested in mid to late October of each year. The apple is medium to large in size. Its flesh is dense, coarse, juicy, and crisp. Its taste high in sugar and low in acid, with nuances similar to caramel and cinnamon.

It suitable for snacking, sandwiches, salads, baking.
