= Russet (color) =

Reddish-brown color

Color coordinates
- Hex triplet: #80461B
- sRGB^{B} (r, g, b): (128, 70, 27)
- HSV (h, s, v): (26°, 79%, 50%)
- CIELCh_{uv} (L, C, h): (36, 54, 33°)
- Source: ColorHexa
- ISCC–NBS descriptor: Strong brown
- B: Normalized to [0–255] (byte)

The color known as russet is a dark brown color with a reddish-orange tinge. As a tertiary color, russet is an equal mix of orange and purple pigments. The first recorded use of russet as a color name in English was in 1562.

The source of this color is The ISCC-NBS Method of Designating Colors and a Dictionary of Color Names (1955) used by stamp collectors to identify the colors of stamps. However, it is widely considered hard to standardize, and the same vary name could be applied to various tones; russet often has no more specific meaning than ruddy or reddish.

The name of this color derives from russet, a coarse cloth made of wool and dyed with woad and madder to give it a subdued grey or reddish-brown shade. By the statute of 1363, poor English people were required to wear russet.

Russet, a color of autumn, is often associated with sorrow or grave seriousness. Anticipating a lifetime of regret, Shakespeare's character Biron says in Love's Labour's Lost, Act V, Scene 2: "Henceforth my wooing mind shall be express'd / In russet yeas and honest kersey noes."

Russet is mentioned in a famous quote taken from a letter Oliver Cromwell wrote to Sir William Spring in September 1643: "I had rather have a plain, russet-coated captain that knows what he fights for, and loves what he knows, [than that which you call a gentleman and is nothing else]".

== See also ==
- Shades of brown
  - Chestnut (color)
  - Chocolate (color)
  - Sepia (color)
- Russet apple
- Russet potato
- Russeting
