= Crimson Delight =

Apple cultivar

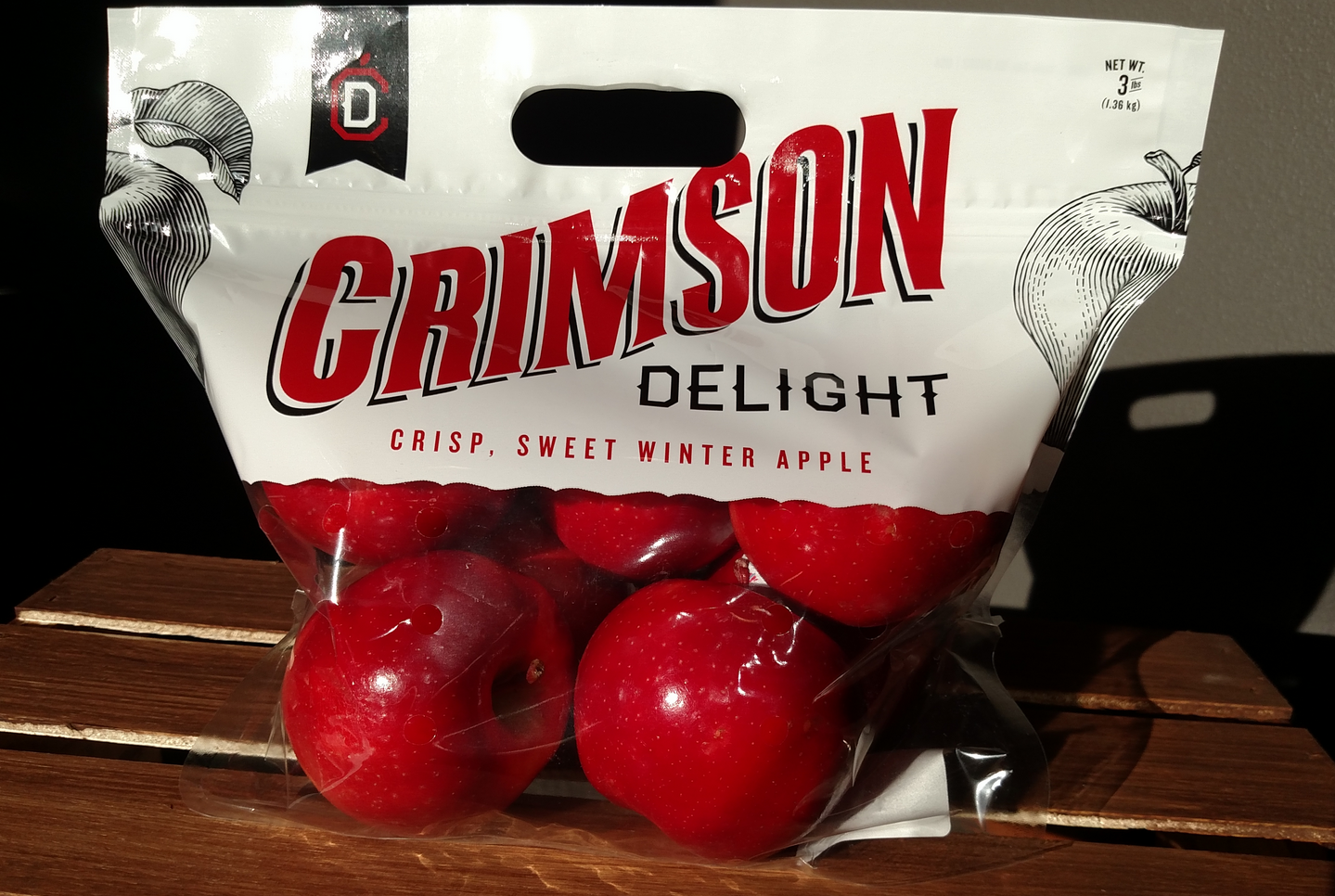
Crimson Delights in a 3 lb pouch bag

Crimson Delight is an apple cultivar and is a cross of a Splendour with a Gala. In February 2016 Washington State University relaunched the apple variety with the name Sunrise Magic. The apple is also known as WA 2.

The Crimson Delight tree has a compact growth habit and is highly productive. The fruit is not prone to sunburn or bitter pit and is harvested in the fall around late September to October. Post-harvest the fruit is not sensitive to bruising and is easy to handle on packing lines. The apple stores exceptionally well and can last 6 months in refrigerated storage and 12 months in controlled atmosphere storage. Flavor peaks as it is stored and ripens further if set out on a counter for a few days to a week.

Crimson Delight is a multi-purpose apple intended for snacking, baking and fresh recipes. The fruit size is medium to large with a firm texture and is crisp and juicy. The skin is an orange red to pinkish blush over a limited yellow background.

== Disease susceptibility ==
- Bitter Pit: Low
- Sunburn: Low
- Stem Bowl Splits: Higher with late harvesting

== See also ==
- List of apple cultivars
