= Stemilt Growers =

American fruit company

Stemilt Growers, LLC
- Type: Private
- Industry: Fruit
- Founded: 1964
- Founder: Tom Mathison
- Headquarters: Wenatchee, Washington, U.S.
- Key people: West Mathison, President
- Products: Cherries, apples, pears, peaches, nectarines
- Number of employees: 1,500
- Website: www.stemilt.com

Stemilt Growers is an American company owned by the Mathison family that grows, packs, and ships fruits. Based in Wenatchee, Washington, Stemilt is the largest fresh market sweet cherry shipper in the world, and one of the nation's largest grower-packer-shippers of apples, pears, cherries, and stone fruit. Its signature apple varieties include Piñata, Honeycrisp, Gala, and Pink Lady. The company is also a leader in organic fruit production, producing 26% of Washington's organic apples and 32% of the Pacific Northwest's organic pears. In 2008, the company shipped over 20 million boxes of fruit and employed 1,500 people full-time.

== History ==
Stemilt's company history dates back to 1893, when the Mathison family homesteaded 160 acres (65 ha) on Stemilt Hill near Wenatchee, Washington. The family planted its first 10 acres (4.0 ha) of apples, pears and cherries in 1914.

By 1947, Tom Mathison, a third generation farmer, took the lead in the family orchard business. He built a fruit packing house on Stemilt Hill in 1961. In 1964, Tom Mathison founded Stemilt Growers and began packing fruit for other growers. In 1975, Mathison built a new packing and storage facility at Olds Station in Wenatchee, which would soon become the new company headquarters. In July 2005, Tom Mathison transferred the company presidency to his grandson, West Mathison. Tom Mathison died in 2008.

=== Name ===
Stemilt "is a Native American word for 'coming from the mountains' or 'foothills to the mountains.' " It is also a region of agricultural land located near the Cascade Mountains and city of Wenatchee, Washington.
