= Honeycrisp =

Apple cultivar

Malus pumila
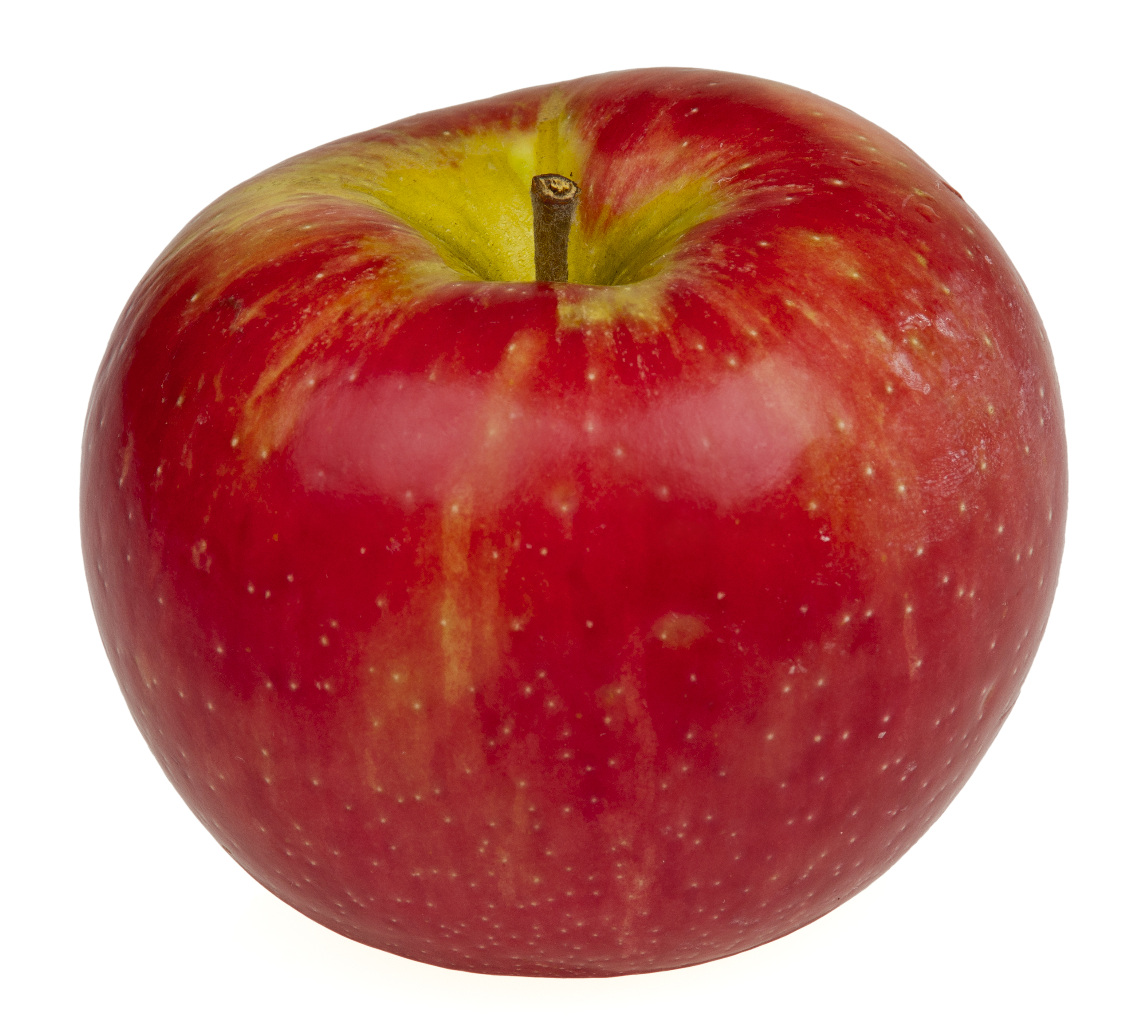
- Honeycrisp apple
- Species: Malus pumila
- Hybrid parentage: Keepsake × MN1627
- Cultivar: MN1711
- Marketing names: Honeycrisp
- Origin: (United States) Chaska, Minnesota, 1960

Honeycrisp is an apple cultivar (cultivated variety) developed at the University of Minnesota's Horticultural Research Center in Chaska, Minnesota. Designated as MN1711 in 1974, patented in 1988, and released in 1991, the Honeycrisp, once slated to be discarded, has rapidly become a prized commercial agricultural product, as its sweetness, firmness, and tartness make it an ideal apple for eating raw. It may also be used for baking and making apple sauce. The advent of the Honeycrisp marks a turning point in the history of the apple industry. As of 2006, the Honeycrisp apple cultivar is now identified as the official state fruit of Minnesota. A large-sized Honeycrisp contains about 116 kilocalories (490 kJ).

Pepin Heights Orchards delivered the first Honeycrisp apples to grocery stores in 1997. The name Honeycrisp was trademarked by the University of Minnesota, but university officials were unsure of its patent status in 2007. The US patent for the Honeycrisp cultivar expired in 2008, although patents in some countries will not expire until as late as 2031. Patent royalties had generated more than $10 million by 2011, split three ways by the University of Minnesota among its inventors, the college and department in which the research was conducted, and a fund for other research.

== Genetics ==
U.S. Plant Patent 7197 and Report 225-1992 (AD-MR-5877-B) from the Horticultural Research Center indicated that the Honeycrisp was a hybrid of the apple cultivars Macoun and Honeygold. However, genetic fingerprinting conducted in 2004 concluded that neither of these cultivars is a parent of the Honeycrisp. It found that one parent was a hybrid of the Keepsake (itself a cross of the Frostbite (MN447) and the Northern Spy) while the other was identified in 2017 as the unreleased variety designated MN1627 by the University of Minnesota. The grandparents of Honeycrisp on the MN1627's side are the Duchess of Oldenburg and the Golden Delicious. Botanists at Cornell University sequenced the genome of the Honeycrisp in 2022.

The Honeycrisp was not developed for high yield, a long shelf life, or ease of transport, but rather for taste, a combination of sweetness and tartness, and its signature crispness. It has larger cells than most other apple cultivars, a trait correlated with juiciness, as larger cells are more prone to rupturing instead of cleaving along the cell walls; this rupturing effect is likely what makes the apple taste juicier. The Honeycrisp retains its pigment well and has a relatively long shelf life when stored in cool, dry conditions.

However, it is a demanding variety for growers and its taste fades after a long period in storage. In order to remedy these defects, breeders have been searching for hybrids that not only appeal to consumers but are also less costly for farmers to cultivate and last longer in storage without losing its taste. By the 2020s, about half of the new apple varieties available for sale in the United States and Canada are progeny of the Honeycrisp. These varieties include the SweeTango (a cross of the Honeycrisp with Zestar) and Rave (with MonArk) from the University of Minnesota; the Cosmic Crisp (Enterprise) and the Sunflare (Cripps Pink/Pink Lady) from Washington State University (WSU); the EverCrisp (Fuji) from the Midwest Apple Improvement Association (MAIA); the SugarBee (a chance seedling whose other parent remains unknown); the SnapDragon and Pink Luster (Gala) from Cornell University; and the Orleans (Empire) from Quebec.

== Characteristics ==
Honeycrisp apple flowers are self-sterile, so another apple variety must be nearby as a pollenizer in order to get fruit. Most other apple varieties will pollenize Honeycrisp, as will varieties of crabapple. Honeycrisp will not come true when grown from seed. Trees grown from the seeds of Honeycrisp apples will be hybrids of Honeycrisp and the pollenizer.

Young trees typically have a lower density of large, well-colored fruit, while mature trees have higher fruit density of fruit with diminished size and color quality. Fruit density can be adjusted through removal of blossom clusters or young fruit to counteract the effect. Flesh firmness is also generally better with lower crop densities. But reducing crop density typically cuts yield in half. Moreover, due to its thin skin, a Honeycrisp apple might be pierced by the stalk of another. Stalks must be clipped by hand during harvest. Bitter pit, a consequence of calcium deficiency, disproportionately affects Honeycrisps; typically 23% of the harvest is affected. This condition could be resolved by spraying. Another major problem for farmers and distributors is that the Honeycrisp, unlike many other varieties, bruises easily and does not last long in (controlled-atmosphere) storage. A good Honeycrisp harvest offers a yield of 60%, which is low compared to other varieties. Honeycrisp apples not acceptable to the retail market are sold to companies producing apple juice, puree, or cider.

The Honeycrisp is harvested in the middle of fall, roughly at the same time as the McIntosh and Gala but before the Red Delicious and Empire. Due to its profitability, the Honeycrisp has also been cultivated in relatively warm regions, resulting in a drop in quality.

Honeycrisp apples are medium to large in size and oblate in shape. Their yellow skin becomes red under sunlight. Small lenticels are visible on the skin. Some green russetting can be seen on the stem end. They have creamy-colored and coarse flesh, and are unusually crisp and juicy. Their flavor varies from mild to highly aromatic.

== International growth ==
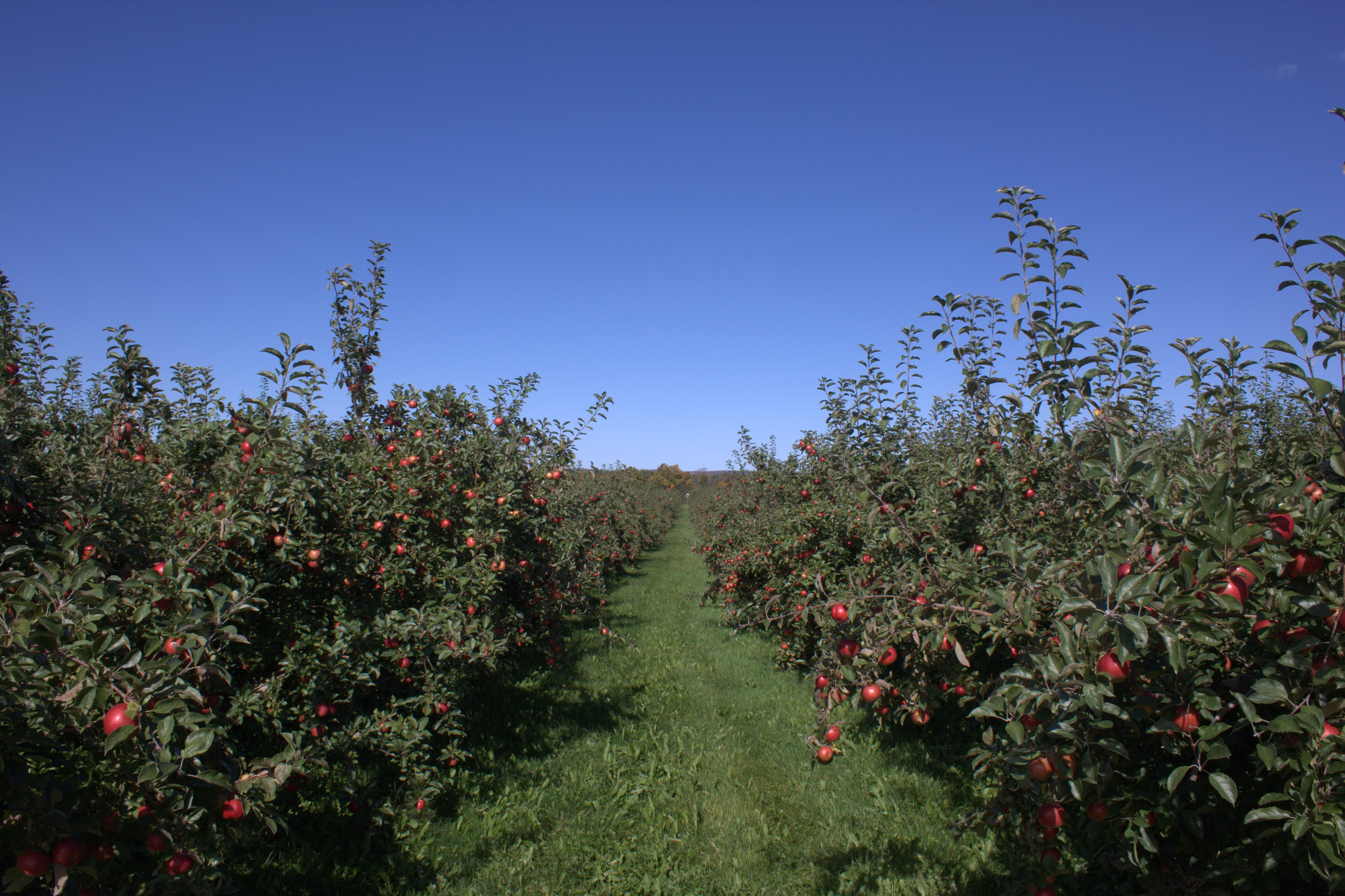
A Honeycrisp apple orchard in Annapolis Valley, Nova Scotia, Canada (2009)

As a result of the Honeycrisp apple's growing popularity, the provincial government of Nova Scotia, Canada, spent over C$1.5 million funding a five-year Honeycrisp Orchard Renewal Program from 2005 to 2010 to subsidize apple producers to replace older trees (mainly McIntosh) with newer varieties of apples that could offer a higher return on investment, namely, the Honeycrisp, Gala, and Ambrosia. By the late 2010s, these have become the three most popular varieties in Canada, taking away the market share of the Red Delicious. The Honeycrisp in particular has been credited with reviving the apple farms of this province, bringing in multiple times more money per bin than older varieties, such as the McIntosh or Cortland apples. Some Nova Scotia farmers even managed to export Honeycrisp apples to the United States. In all, Canada's top Honeycrisp producers are the provinces of Ontario, Nova Scotia, British Columbia, and Quebec. In terms of volumes harvested, the Honeycrisp is the top apple of Nova Scotia. In Quebec, farmers have been modernizing their orchards during the 2020s in order to increase production and sales of the Honeycrisp in their province.

Apple growers in New Zealand's South Island have begun growing Honeycrisp to supply consumers during the US off-season. The first batch of New Zealand-grown Honeycrisp cultivars being introduced to the North American market have been branded using the "HoneyCrunch" registered trademark.

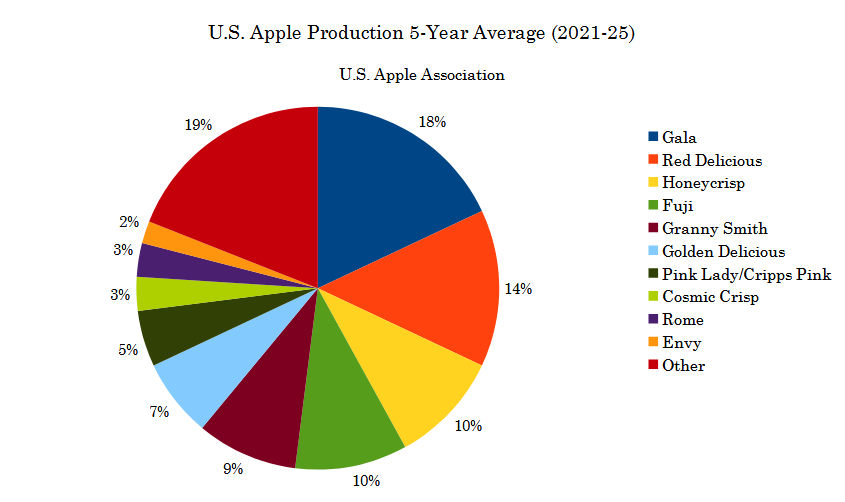
The Honeycrisp continues to be one of the top apple varieties in the United States during the first half of the 2020s.

In the early 2000s, American farmers started replacing the Red Delicious in their orchards with newer cultivars, including the Honeycrisp, which soon became one of the most popular apple varieties in the United States. Its price per pound is at least twice that of other popular varieties in the United States, including the Gala, Red Delicious, Fuji, and Granny Smith. The Honeycrisp overtook the Golden Delicious as the fifth most grown variety in 2018. In fact, between the early 2010s and the mid-2020s, production of the Honeycrisp grew by a factor of five. Data from the US Apple Association shows that its popularity continues to rise during the mid-2020s. In 2025, the Honeycrisp accounted for 12% of the American apple market, behind only the Gala (16%) and Red Delicious (13%). Many consumers know the Honeycrisp by name, and at pick-your-own orchards, it and its progeny, such as the EverCrisp, Rosalee, and Ludacrisp, draw many customers. The Honeycrisp also has a loyal fan base base online; social media posts about the Honeycrisp can quickly attract plenty of attention. Most American Honeycrisp apples are harvested in Washington state, Michigan, and New York. In Washington state, which produces more than half of all American apples, the Honeycrisp was second only to the Gala in terms of the number of 42-pound (19 kg) bushels harvested in the 2025–26 season.

== See also ==
- Horticulture
