= Honeygold =

Apple cultivar

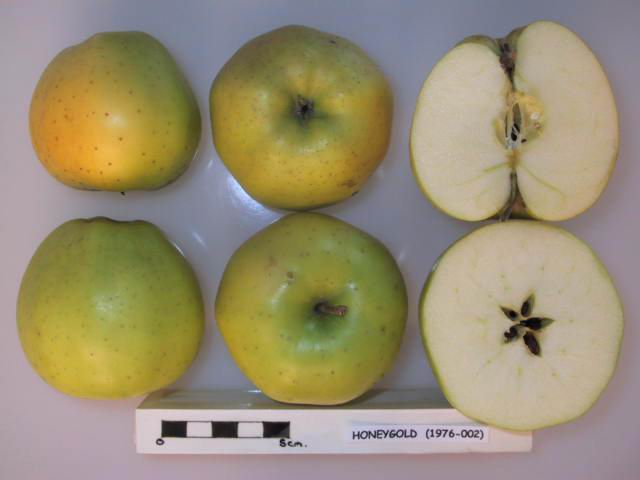
- Species: Malus domestica
- Hybrid parentage: Golden Delicious × Haralson
- Cultivar: Honeygold
- Origin: (United States) University of Minnesota, 1935

Honeygold is a cold-hardy cultivar of domesticated apple, which was developed to suit for the northern cold areas. It was developed by the Minnesota Agricultural Experiment Station's Horticultural Research Center of the University of Minnesota. They were crossing a Golden Delicious with a Haralson in order to obtain a Golden Delicious style fruit with the cold hardiness of the Haralson, a goal which was successfully achieved.

'Honeygold' produces pinkish white blossoms at each spring. Fruit size is medium to large round conical shape. Skin surface is smooth and golden-yellow to greenish with red-bronze blush. Flesh is yellowish-white with flavor very similar to Golden Delicious but is sweeter, crisper and more bland. It stores well, approximately 3 months, and is best for use in fresh eating and salads. It may also be used for baking, apple pies, and apple sauce.

Honeygold is somewhat famous from being falsely labeled as one parent of the Honeycrisp.
