= Charcuterie board =

Appetizer served on a wooden board

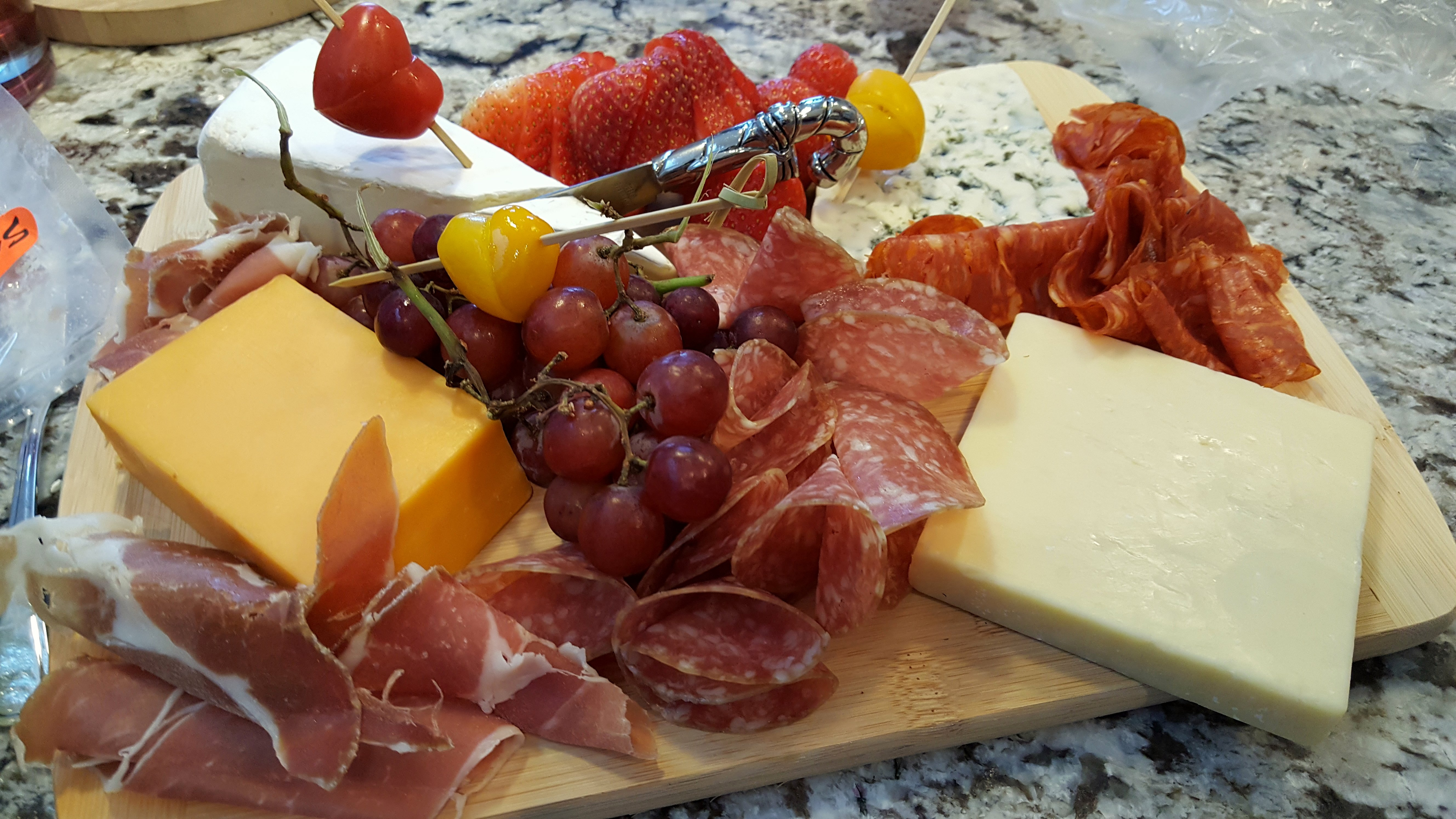
- A charcuterie board with various cured meats, cheeses, and fruits
- Course: Appetizer
- Place of origin: France
- Region or state: Europe; North America
- Serving temperature: Cold
- Main ingredients: Charcuterie, cheeses, breads, fruits, vegetables, nuts, spreads
- Variations: Numerous

A charcuterie board is of French origin and typically served as an appetizer on a wooden board or stone slab, either eaten straight from the board itself or portioned onto tableware. In the USA, 'charcuterie' is a misnomer, featuring a selection of preserved foods, especially cured meats or pâtés, as well as cheeses and crackers or bread. Of European origin, 'charcuterie' refers to cold meats (e.g. salami, ham etc.) and the term 'charcuterie board' would not be widely used for a board with cheese, fruit and a small amount of meat as is the case in North America. Instead the term cheese board might be used for a dish with largely cheese or some other descriptive title used for a board with a large variety of different cold foodstuffs.

== History ==
=== Europe ===
Charcuterie is cured meat, derived from the French chair, 'flesh', and cuit, 'cooked' and was coined in 15th century France. The owners of shops specializing in charcuterie (charcutiers) became popular for their detailed preparation of cured meats and helped establish stylized arrangements of food as part of French culinary culture.

However, according to food historian Sarah Wassberg Johnson, charcuterie also has its roots in the simple meals that had been eaten by laborers of the working class throughout Europe since the medieval period, often consisting of meats, cheeses, bread, local produce, and wine or beer. Moreover, these meals evolved and found their way to higher society with the cheese course of formal dinners in 18th and 19th century France, Great Britain, and colonial America. The cheese course remained common at these formal dinners before they were rapidly replaced by the dessert course by the end of the 19th century.

=== United States ===
Throughout the 19th and 20th centuries in the United States, the practice of hosting dinners became increasingly informal as time went on, especially by the 1910s, when formal dinners were largely replaced by cocktail parties where a variety of finger foods served throughout the night was preferred over scheduled meal courses. During World War II, American soldiers were introduced to regional charcuteries and cheeses of France, Italy, Germany, and Greece and helped proliferate an interest in European cuisines when they returned home. However, it wasn't until the 1990s that charcuterie boards had a resurgence in popularity as American grocery stores diversified their offerings and specialty food stores became more common.

While charcuterie boards are common appetizers in restaurants today, they continue to find popularity in private gatherings like house and dinner parties due to their ease of preparation. Even so, with the advent of social media in the 2010s, especially image-based apps like Instagram, charcuterie boards also became incredibly complex and expensive, featuring dozens of meats, cheeses, and accompaniments on display for followers and monetization. Chicago-based IRI reported sales of charcuterie types of packaged lunch meats reached $561 million in 2019, up 8.1% from the previous year.

== Composition ==
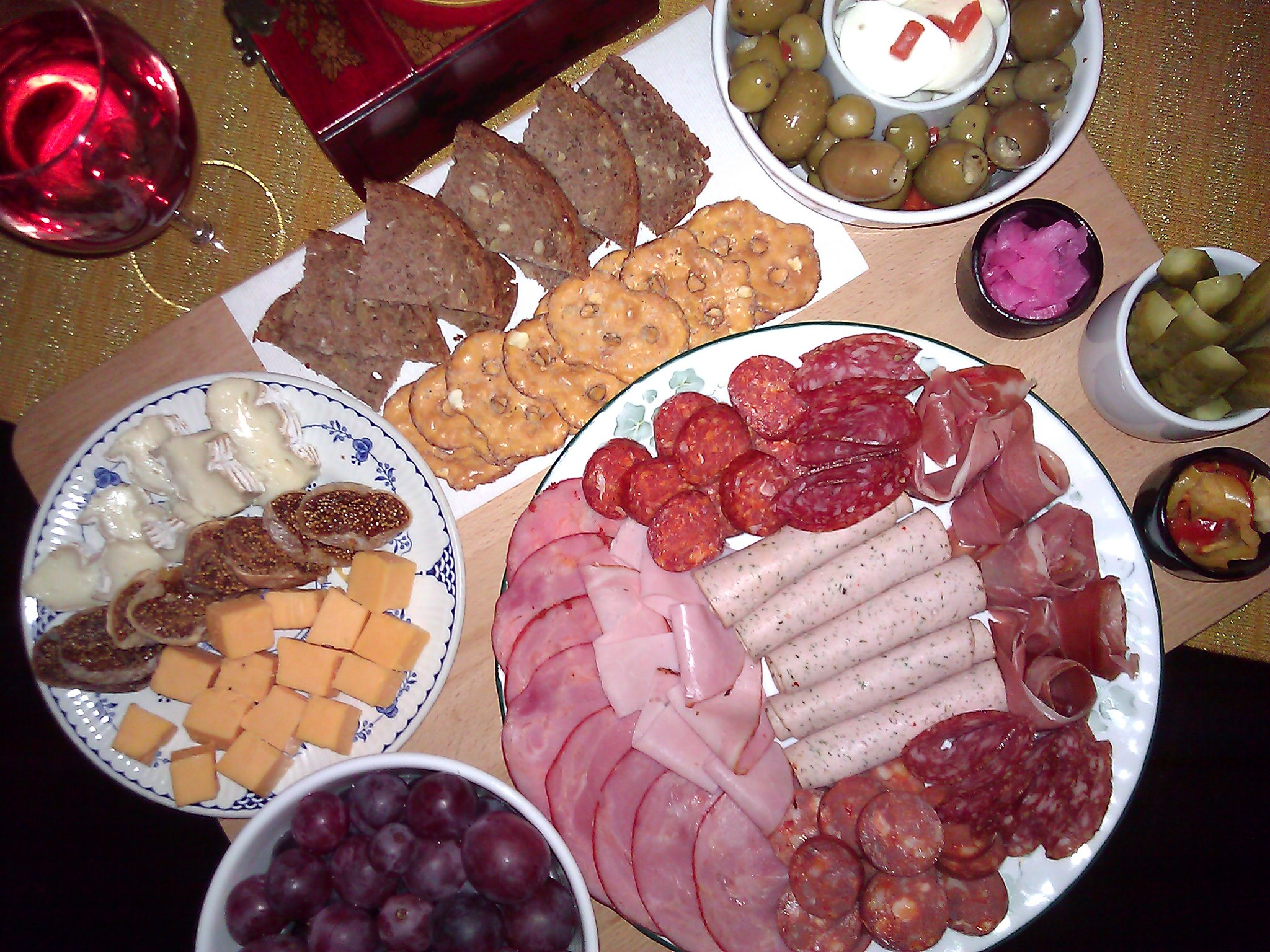
A charcuterie board with fruits, pickled vegetables, meats and wine

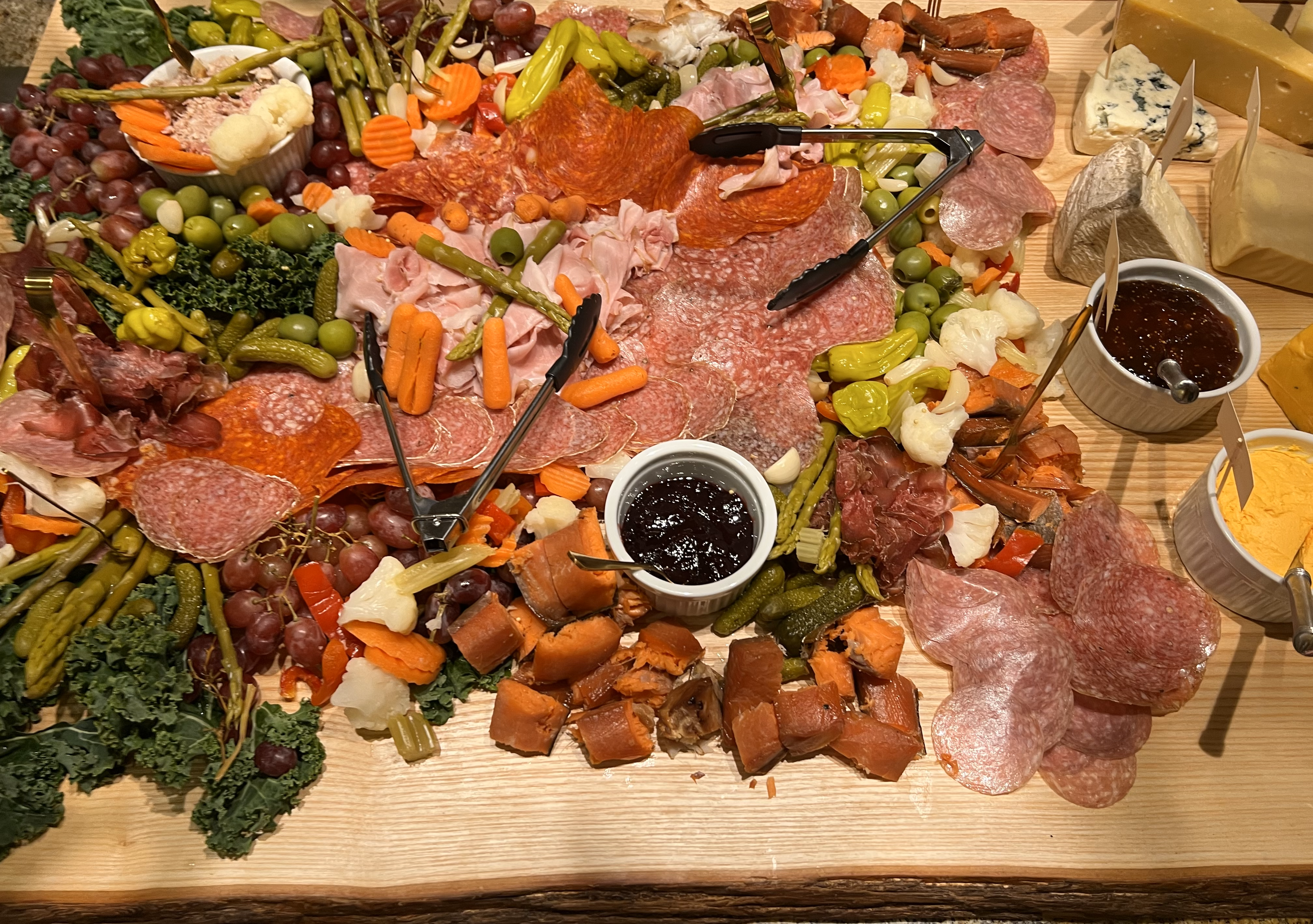
A traditional-styled charcuterie board with meats, carrots, chili peppers, cheese, and jam.

It is generally recommended to diversify the items on a charcuterie board in terms of type (e.g. sausage vs. ham vs. forcemeat), texture (e.g. firm vs. spreadable vs. crumbly cheese), flavor (e.g. sweet vs. salty vs. spicy), origin (e.g. cow vs. sheep vs. goat), and nationality (e.g. French vs. Italian vs. British), among other characteristics. Beyond meats, cheeses, and breads, other components are often included to complement the flavors and textures of these foods. Examples include fresh or dried fruits, olives and olive oil, nuts, vinegars, pickled or fresh vegetables/crudités, fresh herbs, chocolates, edible flowers, and a variety of spreads such as mustards, honey, and fruit preserves. Charcuterie boards may also be accompanied by different varieties of wines.

In addition to the food components, charcuterie boards themselves are typically made of either wood or stone (typically slate or marble) in order to keep foods cool during service. Other equipment present on the board may include cheese knives for guests to serve themselves, spoons and ramekins for portioning and holding spreads, and labels for the various meats and cheeses to help inform guests.

== See also ==
- Antipasto
- Brotzeit
- List of hors d'oeuvre
- Meze
- Ploughman's lunch
- Smörgåsbord
- Tapas
