= SugarBee =

Apple variety

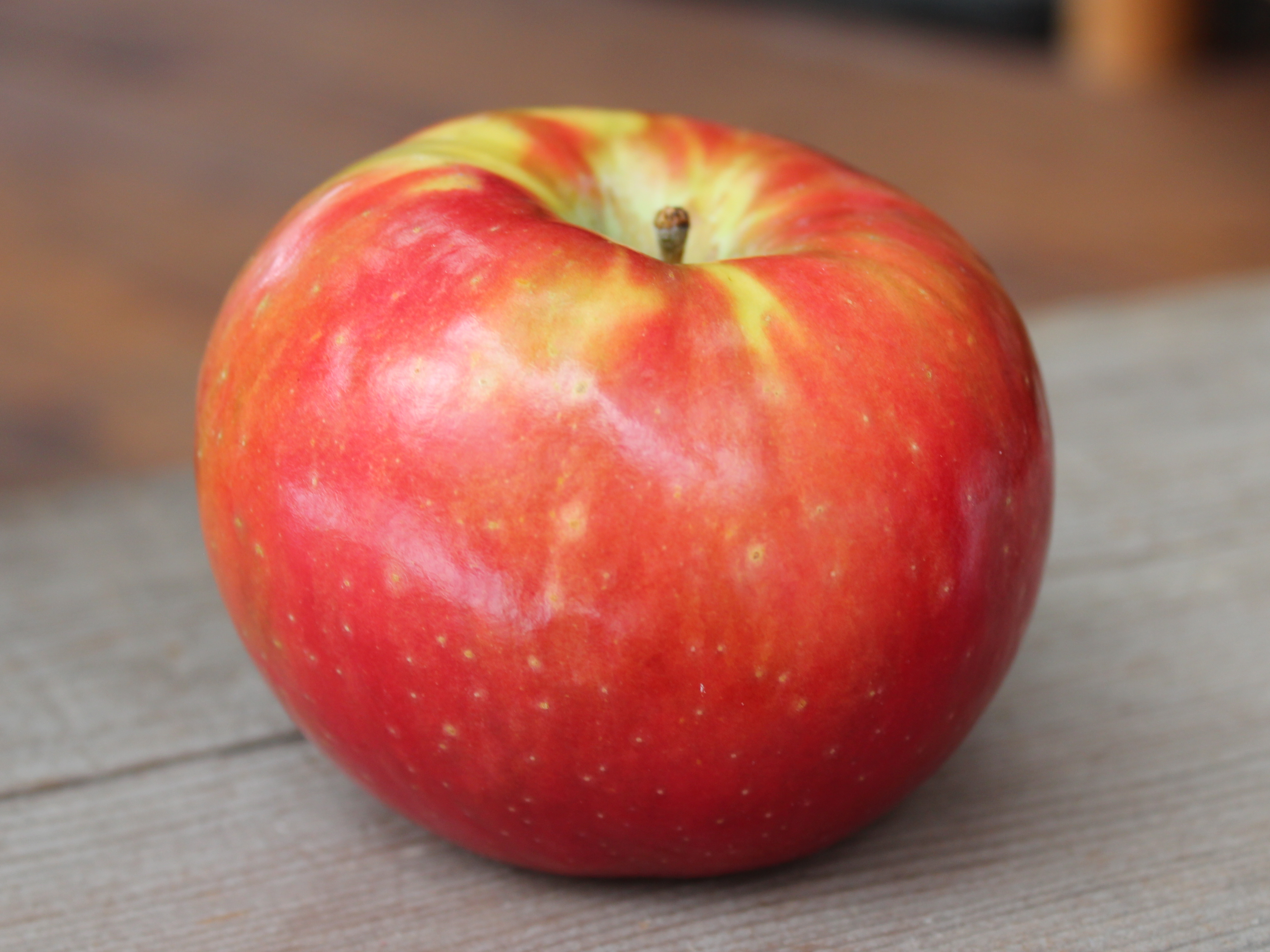
- Species: Malus domestica
- Hybrid parentage: Honeycrisp × unknown
- Cultivar: B51 or CN121
- Marketing names: SugarBee
- Origin: (United States) Worthington, Minnesota, 1990s

SugarBee (B51 or CN121) is a cultivated variety or cultivar of apple discovered by Chuck Nystrom in the early 1990s at his orchard in Worthington, Minnesota. Believed to be a hybrid between a Honeycrisp and another, unknown variety, it is named in recognition of the role played by bees in open pollination, making the variety possible. It was brought to market in 2016. This apple variety is harvested in the fall and is suitable for snacking, baking, apple butter, cooking, juicing, apple sauce, and salads, as well as various desserts and cocktails. Like its parent variety, the Honeycrisp, the SugarBee is a sweet and crisp apple, but is capable of lasting much longer in controlled-atmosphere storage. Its flavor is similar to caramel, honey, and molasses. It is initially available from October to May, but since 2024, efforts have been made to ensure that SugarBee apples are available all year round. In addition, because it has proven to be not just popular among consumers but also easy on farmers, many orchard owners in Washington state have been making the switch from the Honeycrisp to the SugarBee, among other varieties of apple.

SugarBee propagation rights are held by Regal Fruit International and licensed to Gebbers Farms and the Chelan Fruit Cooperative in Washington State to produce the variety in the United States. Patent for the SugarBee will expire in 2032. In the 2023-24 crop year, the SugarBee accounted for 17% of the apples produced in small volumes in Washington, a category that included 5.5% of the total production of that state. Production grew from 402,000 boxes in 2020 to almost 1.5 million four years later. Demand for organic SugarBee apples has been rising as well. However, due to limited supplies, SugarBee apples are currently only available for sale at small or regional grocery chains. By the mid-2020s, it has been under testing by growers in China, New Zealand, South Africa, and Chile.
