= Russeting =

Abnormality of fruit skin

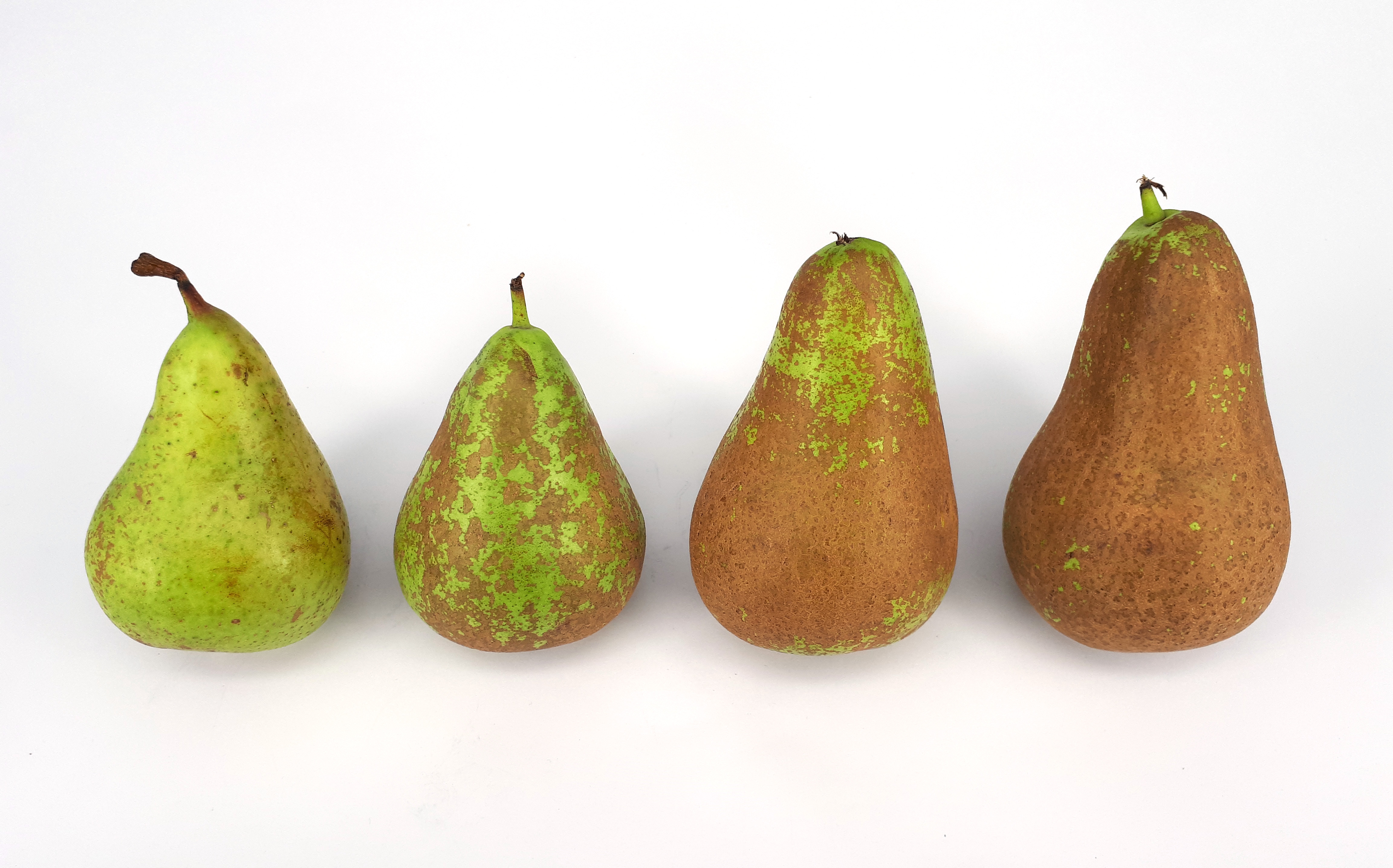
Four pears featuring various degrees of russeting

Russeting or russetting is an abnormality of fruit skin which manifests in russet-colored (brownish) patches that are rougher than healthy skin. It is a common feature in apples and pears. Russeting is typically an undesirable trait, which reduces the storage life of fruits and makes their appearance unattractive to consumers, although some cultivars, so-called russet apples, are appreciated for the feature.

== Causes ==
In apples and pears, russet results from micro-cracking of the cuticle, the outer epidermal layer of the fruit. The cuticle is a natural waterproof barrier composed of a polymerized cutin matrix embedded with waxes, which protects the fruit from outside stresses, and helps maintain post-harvest preservation. When the cuticle cracks, a cork-like suberized layer is formed on the fruit skin.

Apples are particularly susceptible to russet. Many naturally occurring varieties exhibit the feature consistently, while other cultivars may develop russet due to environmental stresses. As a result, cuticular structure is impaired, leading to reduced strength of the peel, which impacts handling and post-harvest processing. Russeting and cuticular cracks may accelerate the development of flesh browning due to oxidation, as well as softening of internal tissue due to the loss of an external support.

== Gallery ==
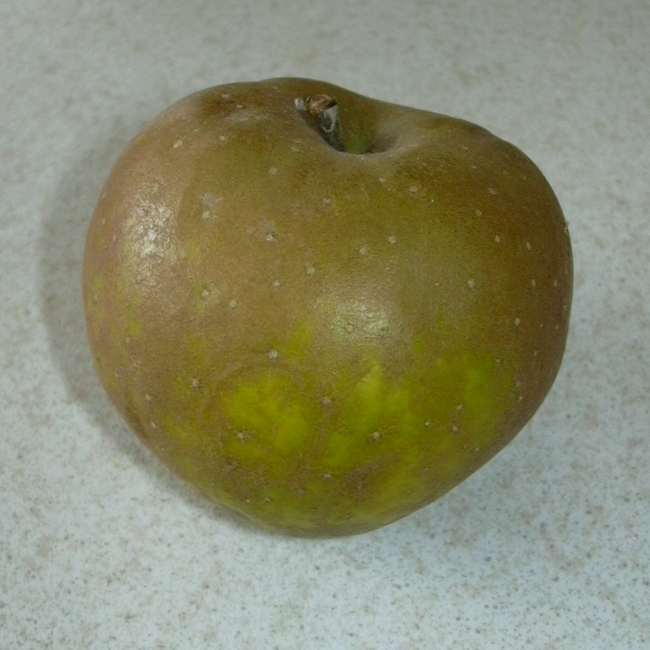
An Egremont Russet apple, almost completely covered in russeting

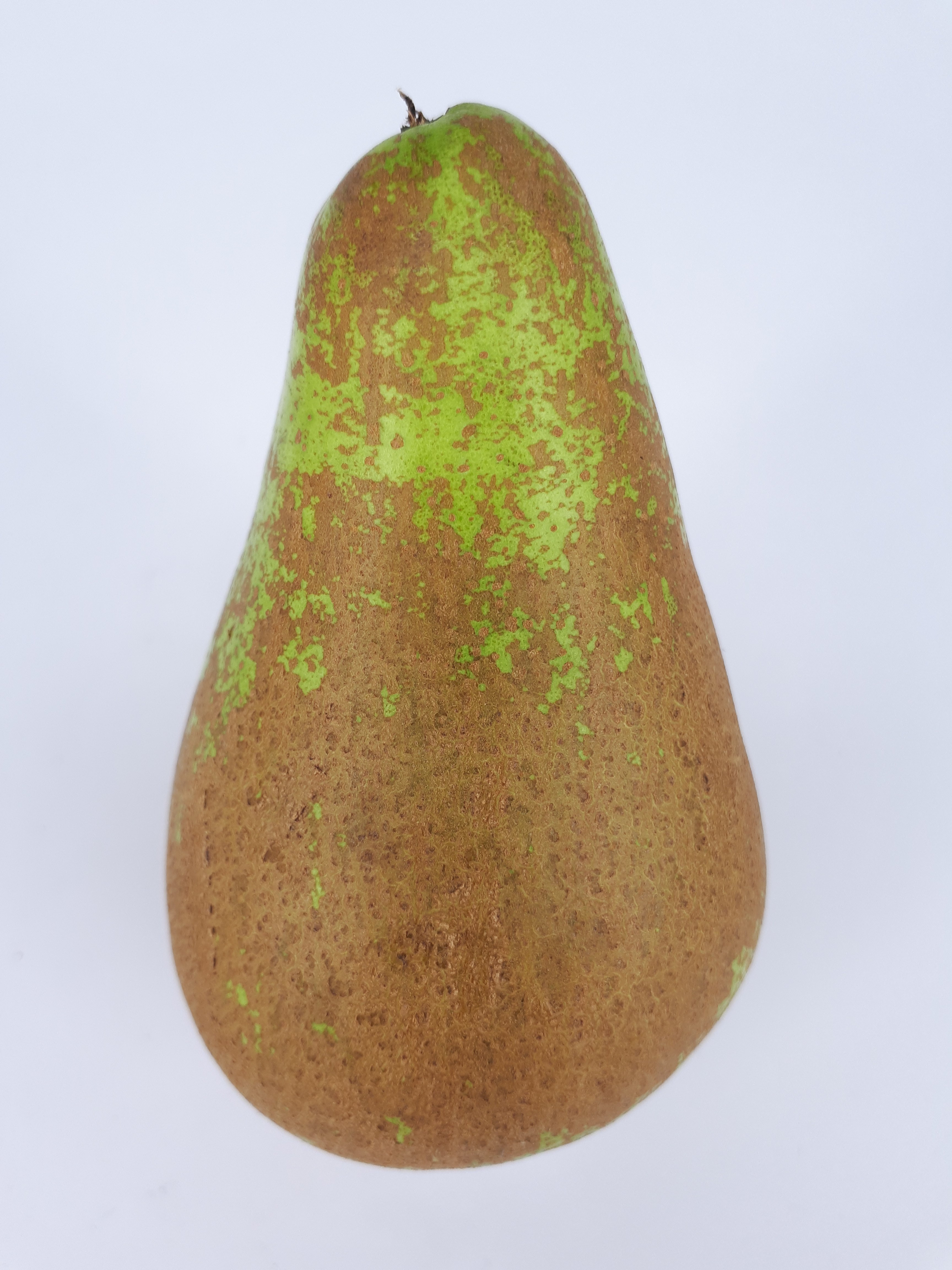
Conference pear

== See also ==
- Russet potato
