= SweeTango =

Cultivated apple

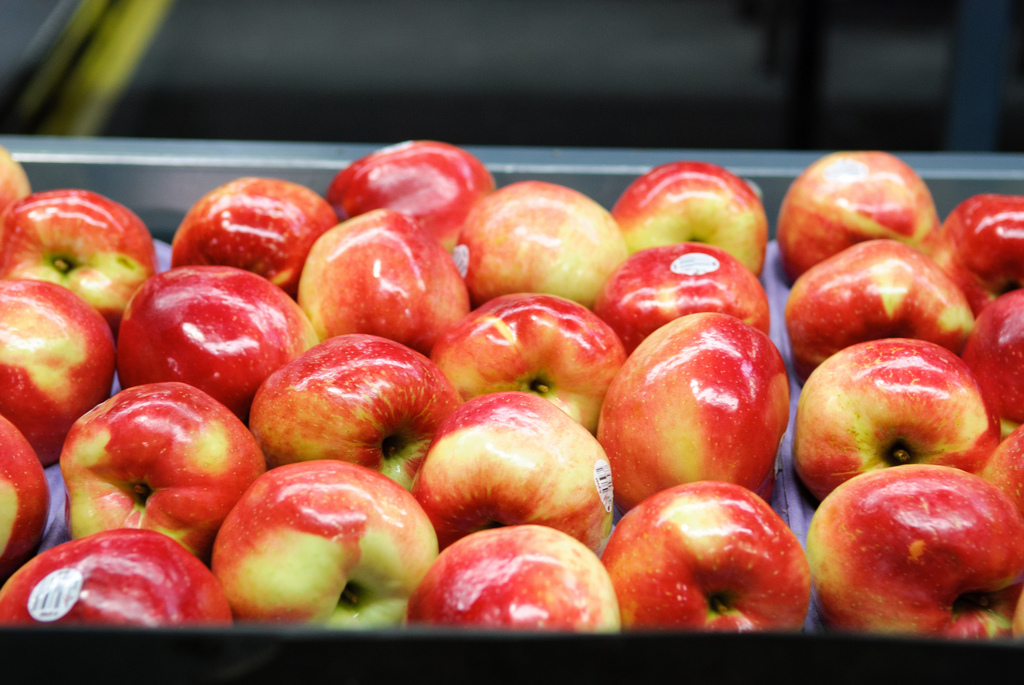
- Species: Malus domestica
- Hybrid parentage: Honeycrisp × Zestar
- Cultivar: Minneiska
- Marketing names: SweeTango
- Origin: (United States) University of Minnesota, 1991

SweeTango is the brand name of the cultivated apple variety Minneiska, a hybrid between the Honeycrisp and the Zestar apples belonging to the University of Minnesota. The apple is controlled and regulated for marketing, allowing only exclusive territories for growing. It has a sweet-tart taste that some food writers have described as something between brown sugar and spiced apple cider.

University of Minnesota awarded Pepin Heights Orchards exclusive marketing rights to grow and sell the Minneiska apple. They then in turn developed a cooperative of certain selected farm growers and sold rights to these members to produce the apple. It was exclusive at first to the state of Minnesota and later membership was expanded to certain qualifying farmers, mostly to growers of the northern parts of the United States. The concept of exclusive control of a variety of fruit was then a novelty in the United States, leading to lawsuits, which were later dismissed.

== Background ==
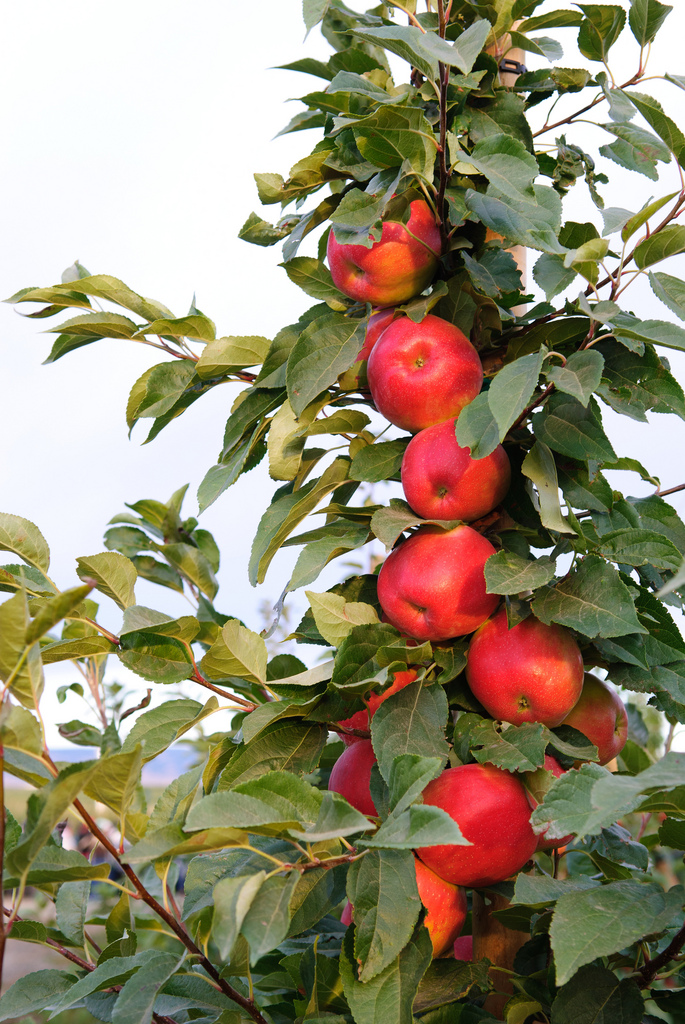
SweeTango apples during harvest season in Wenatchee, Washington.

Introduced in 1991 by the University of Minnesota, the Honeycrisp has become one of the most popular apple varieties in the United States. However, it is also notoriously difficult to cultivate and has a taste that fades after long storage. This has led to the search for hybrids that not only appeal to consumers but are also less costly for farmers to cultivate and last longer in storage. The Minneiska is a hybrid of two other apple varieties the university developed – the Honeycrisp and the Minnewashta (brand name Zestar!) – produced by the Minneiska tree. This new apple variety was given the brand name SweeTango. It was refined by University of Minnesota in 1999 from a grafted tree of 1988, and released in 2006. It became publicly available in 2007.

The name is a registered trademark owned by University of Minnesota. In 2000, the new apple variety was known during development by the identifier MN 1914. It was created by University of Minnesota's plant development program at their Horticultural Research Center.

== Agriculture ==
The Minneiska apple has a texture similar to its parents, the Minnewashta and Honeycrisp apples, with a slightly tart fall spicy citric quality. The concentrated flavors are "more complex than the Honeycrisp"; author Amy Traverso compared the apple's flavor to "spiced apple cider".

== Exclusive rights ==
Logo of the apple variety

The University of Minnesota awarded exclusive marketing rights to grow, have others raise, and sell the Minneiska apple cultivar and any mutations to Minnesota's largest apple orchard, Pepin Heights Orchards of Lake City, Minnesota. The orchard in turn in 2006 established a 45-member grower's cooperative named Next Big Thing. These commercial growers were originally only in the state of Minnesota. An exception was granted to Minnesota orchard growers for plantings in very small amounts.

The cooperative later branched out and allowed members from Michigan, Washington, New York and a few other northern states. By 2010, this cooperative included farmers from Quebec and Nova Scotia, Canada. The apple could not be grown by non-members. Members, who pay royalties for a license on producing the Minneiska trees, can sell the apple only through the cooperative. The practice, called "managed variety" for high quality standards, was a new concept to the United States when the apple was developed.

The practice implementation has attracted criticism due to its development through a public research institution. In 2010, a lawsuit was filed challenging the legality of University of Minnesota selling exclusive rights to the new variety. However, the Fourth Judicial District Court of Minnesota ruled in 2012 that, "Minnesota’s antitrust and monopoly laws do not apply to its land-grant university." The SweeTango is one of the first commercially available apple varieties to have been trademarked.

== Genetics ==
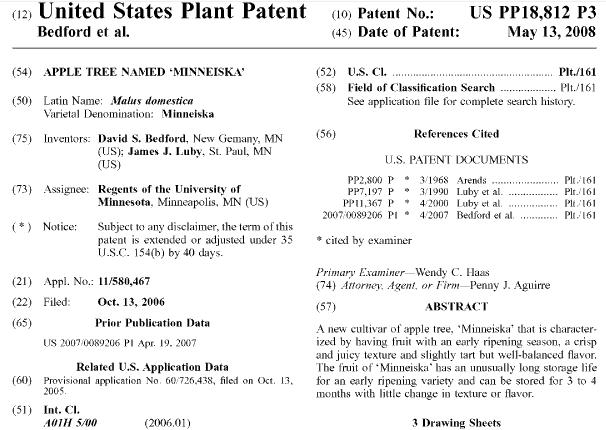
U.S. Patent US PP18,812 P3

The trademark belongs to University of Minnesota for its apple fruit of the Minneiska cultivar. The patent number was obtained on May 13, 2008, by research scientist breeders David S. Bedford and James J. Luby. The varietal denomination Minneiska has a Latin name of Malus domestica and its patent says in part that it was an exclusive new cultivar that was developed using grafting techniques.

In 2008, the variety was patented by the university, the same year its patent for the Honeycrisp expired in the United States.

== Sources ==
- Traverso, Amy (2011). The Apple Lover's Cookbook. W. W. Norton and Company. ISBN 9780393241846.
- United States Plant Patents. United States Patent & Trademark Office. 2008. OCLC 27833628.
- Woodler, Olwen (2015). The Apple Cookbook / 125 Freshly Picked Recipes (Third ed.). Storey Publishings. ISBN 9781612125190.
