= Prima apple =

Apple cultivar

'Prima' apple
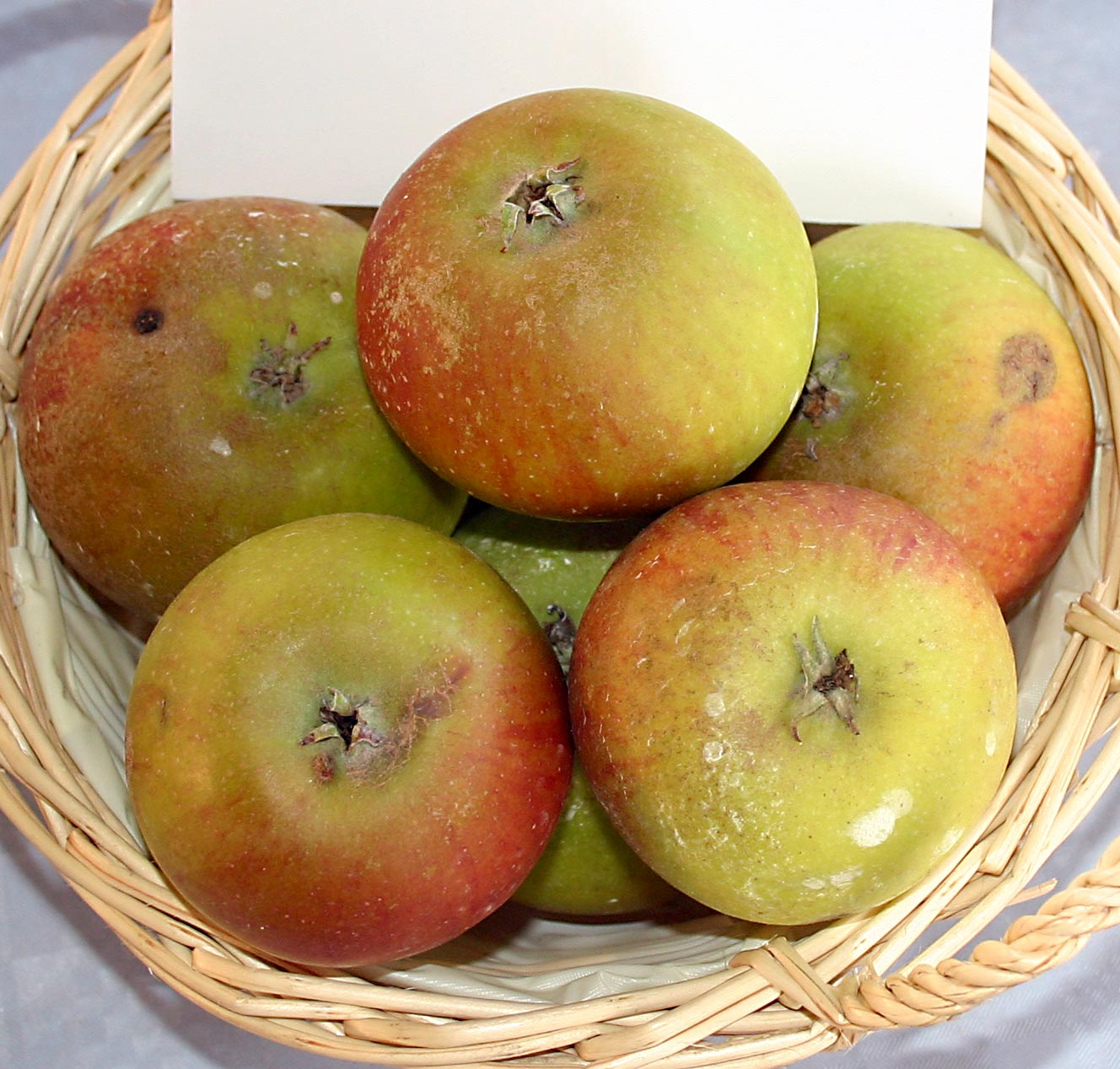
- Genus: Malus
- Species: Malus domestica
- Hybrid parentage: Complexe
- Cultivar: 'Prima'
- Origin: USA, PRI disease resistant apple breeding program, 1958

The 'Prima' apple is one of the modern disease resistant cultivars of domesticated apple which was bred by the PRI disease resistant apple breeding program in 1958. The disease resistance against apple scab has since been broken.

Like other "PRI" apples it is of complex ancestry to ensure the utmost disease resistance and various cultivation advantages, along with a fresh vibrant flavor. Its ancestry includes the 'Rome Beauty', 'Melba', 'Golden Delicious' and 'Wealthy' apples, as well as the Malus floribunda crabapple for scab resistance. "PRI" is impressed in the cultivars name "PRI"ma.

'Prima' was originally very resistant to apple scab due to having the Vf gene. However scab has since evolved around that resistance, and 'Prima' apples are now heavily affected by apple scab in regions where the new apple scab has spread to. As such, 'Prima' is no longer a recommended apple variety for garden use without pesticides.

It has a juicy flesh with a balanced mild sub-acid flavour, a red flushed skin over yellow background. It does not fall off the tree, and like most early harvest apples, does not keep well, even with refrigeration.

== See also ==
- List of apple cultivars
