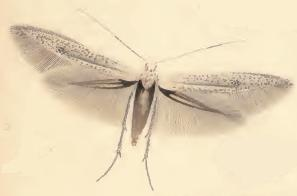

Scientific classification
- Kingdom: Animalia
- Phylum: Arthropoda
- Clade: Pancrustacea
- Class: Insecta
- Order: Lepidoptera
- Family: Coleophoridae
- Genus: Coleophora
- Species: C. hemerobiella

Binomial name
- Coleophora hemerobiella (Scopoli, 1763)

Synonyms
- Phalaena hemerobiella Scopoli, 1763

= Coleophora hemerobiella =

Fruit tree case moth

Species of moth

Coleophora hemerobiella, the fruit tree case moth, is a moth of the family Coleophoridae, found in western Europe.

== Description ==
The wingspan is about 14 mm. Adults have whitish forewings speckled with dark grey and usually an obvious blackish spot at around three-quarters. They are on wing in July in western Europe.

The larvae feed on Amelanchier, Chaenomeles, Cotoneaster affinis, Cotoneaster integerrimus, Crataegus laevigata, Cydonia oblonga, Malus domestica, Malus baccata, Malus domestica, Malus floribunda, Malus fusca, Malus asiatica, Malus sylvestris, Mespilus germanica, Prunus avium, Prunus cerasifera, Prunus cerasus, Prunus domestica, Prunus spinosa, Pyrus communis, Sorbus aria, Sorbus aucuparia, Sorbus intermedia, Spiraea japonica and Spiraea × vanhouttei. Full-grown cases can be found from the end of May to early June.

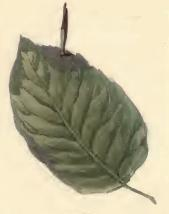
Mined pear leaf

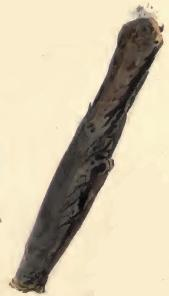
Larval case

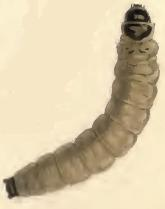
Larva

== Distribution ==
It is found in western Europe, except Ireland and the Iberian Peninsula.
