= Enterprise (apple) =

Apple cultivar

'Enterprise'
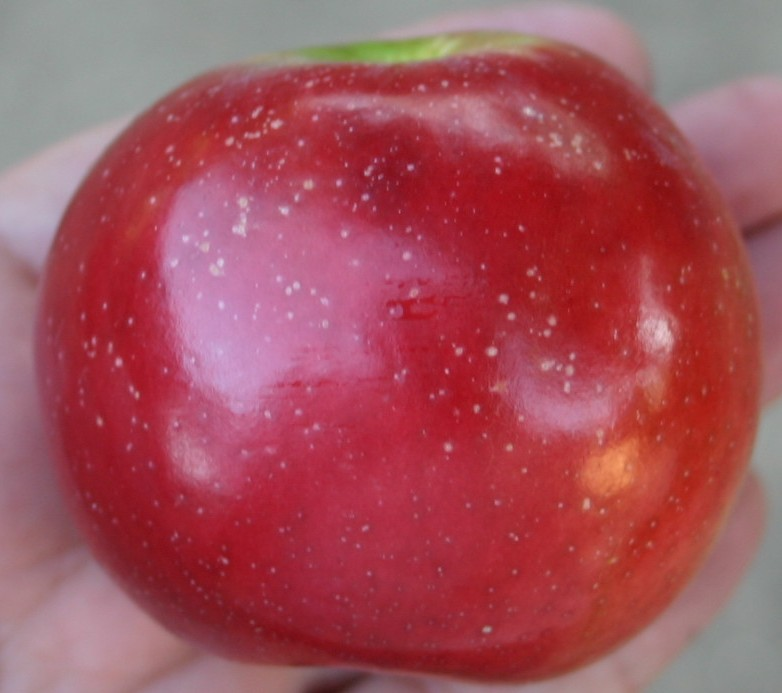
- An Enterprise apple
- Genus: Malus
- Species: Malus domestica
- Hybrid parentage: Complex
- Cultivar: 'Enterprise'
- Origin: (United States) , PRI disease resistant apple breeding program

Enterprise is a modern bred, late-ripening red cultivar of domesticated apple. It has a resistance to scab, cedar apple rust and fire blight.

Enterprise is the ninth apple cultivar to be developed by the PRI disease resistant apple breeding program and "PRI" is remarked in its name Enter"PRI"se. It has combined genetics of many selected breeds, including ancestry of McIntosh apple, Golden Delicious, Starking Delicious, Rome Beauty and the vf gene of Malus floribunda for scab resistance.

Fruit shape is usually somewhat elongated in shape, and lopsided in young trees. They are big in size, red flush over yellow, fading to orange.

The WA 38 cv. Cosmic Crisp brand apple, developed at Washington State University, is the offspring of the Enterprise apple and the Honeycrisp apple.

== See also ==
- List of apple cultivars
