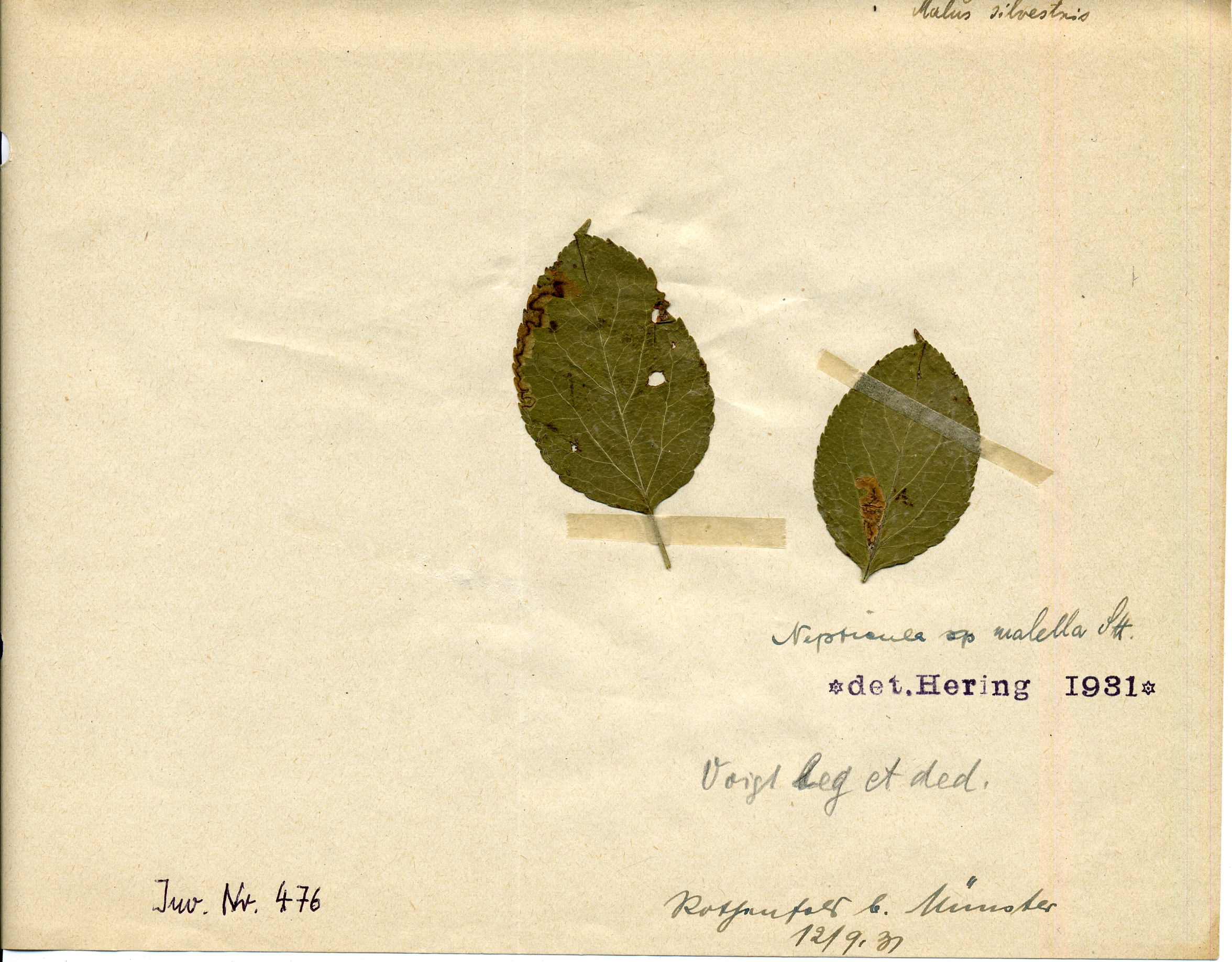

Scientific classification
- Kingdom: Animalia
- Phylum: Arthropoda
- Clade: Pancrustacea
- Class: Insecta
- Order: Lepidoptera
- Family: Nepticulidae
- Genus: Stigmella
- Species: S. malella

Binomial name
- Stigmella malella (Stainton, 1854)

Synonyms
- Nepticula malella Stainton, 1854; Nepticula angustella Heinemann & Wocke, 1877; Nepticula nigrobrunella Groschke, 1939

= Stigmella malella =

Species of moth

The banded apple pigmy (Stigmella malella) is a moth of the family Nepticulidae. It is found in almost all of Europe, except Iceland and Norway.

The wingspan is 4–6 millimetres (0.16–0.24 in).The head is ferruginous-ochreous, the collar whitish. The antennal eyecaps are whitish, and the forewings dark fuscous with a shining white fascia beyond the middle. The hindwings are grey.

Adults are on wing from April to August.

The larvae feed on Malus x astracanica, Malus baccata, Malus domestica, Malus floribunda, Malus fusca, Malus ringo, Malus sylvestris and sometimes Prunus. They mine the leaves of their host plant.
