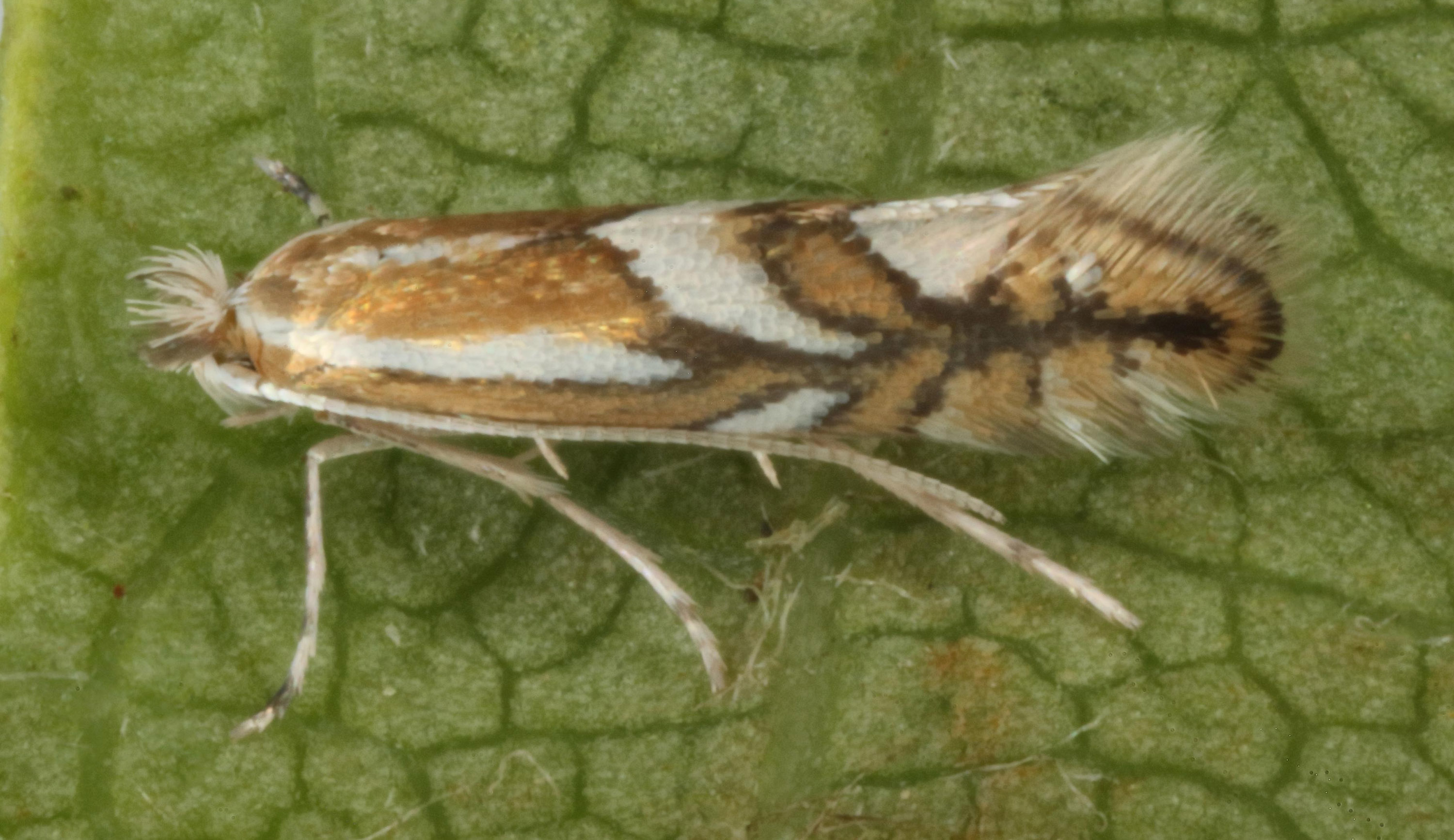
- Phyllonorycter blancardella, Newborough Forest, North Wales

Scientific classification
- Kingdom: Animalia
- Phylum: Arthropoda
- Class: Insecta
- Order: Lepidoptera
- Family: Gracillariidae
- Genus: Phyllonorycter
- Species: P. blancardella

Binomial name
- Phyllonorycter blancardella (Fabricius, 1781)

Synonyms
- Tinea blancardella Fabricius, 1781; Lithocolletis concomitella Bankes, 1899

= Phyllonorycter blancardella =

Species of moth

Phyllonorycter blancardella, the spotted tentiform leafminer, is a moth of the family Gracillariidae. It is known from all of Europe, east to Ukraine and central Anatolia. It is also known throughout North America including Nova Scotia, Quebec, Ontario, Wisconsin and California.

The wingspan is 6–9 mm. The forewing ground colour is variable but not grey. It is sometimes orange or tawny and often with a dusty sprinkling of blackish scales. White streaks sometimes join together to form larger markings (fascia and spots). P. blancardella is very similar to Phyllonorycter hostis and other Rosaceae-feeding Phyllonorycter species and only determined by examination of genitalia preparations.See Lewis British Lepidoptera for an overview of the difficulties surrounding correct identification.

Adults emerge in May and again in August in two generations in western Europe.

The larvae feed on Malus angustifolia, Malus x astracanica, Malus baccata, Malus coronaria, Malus domestica, Malus floribunda, Malus fusca, Malus ringo, Malus x robusta and Malus sylvestris. They mine the leaves of their host plant.

== Control ==
The spotted tentiform leafminer is a serious pest of various apple species (Malus), along with the apple blotch leafminer moth (Phyllonorycter crataegella) and others. Infestation may result in reduced crop yield. Both species, like many other pests, show an increasing resistance to organophosphate and synthetic pyrethroid insecticides.

Two species of very small wasps, the eulophid Sympiesis marylandensis and the braconid Pholetesor ornigis are parasites of both P. blancardella and P. crataegella. Biological control includes reducing the use of broad spectrum insecticides, helping these and other parasitoids to flourish and reduce leaf miner damage. Mulching fallen leaves may also allow fragments to be pulled underground by earthworms.
