= Stigmella incognitella =

Scientific classification
- Kingdom: Animalia
- Phylum: Arthropoda
- Class: Insecta
- Order: Lepidoptera
- Family: Nepticulidae
- Genus: Stigmella
- Species: S. incognitella

Binomial name
- Stigmella incognitella (Herrich-Schaffer, 1855)

Synonyms
- Nepticula incognitella Herrich-Schaffer, 1855; Nepticula mali Hering, 1932; Nepticula pomella Vaughan, 1858

Species of moth

Stigmella incognitella is a moth of the family Nepticulidae. It is found in all of Europe except Iceland, Ireland, Norway and Bulgaria.

The wingspan is 5–6 mm. Adults are on wing from July to November.

The larvae feed on Malus baccata, Malus domestica, Malus floribunda and Malus sylvatica. They mine the leaves of their host plant.
