= Pristine apple =

Apple cultivar

Malus domestica 'Pristine'
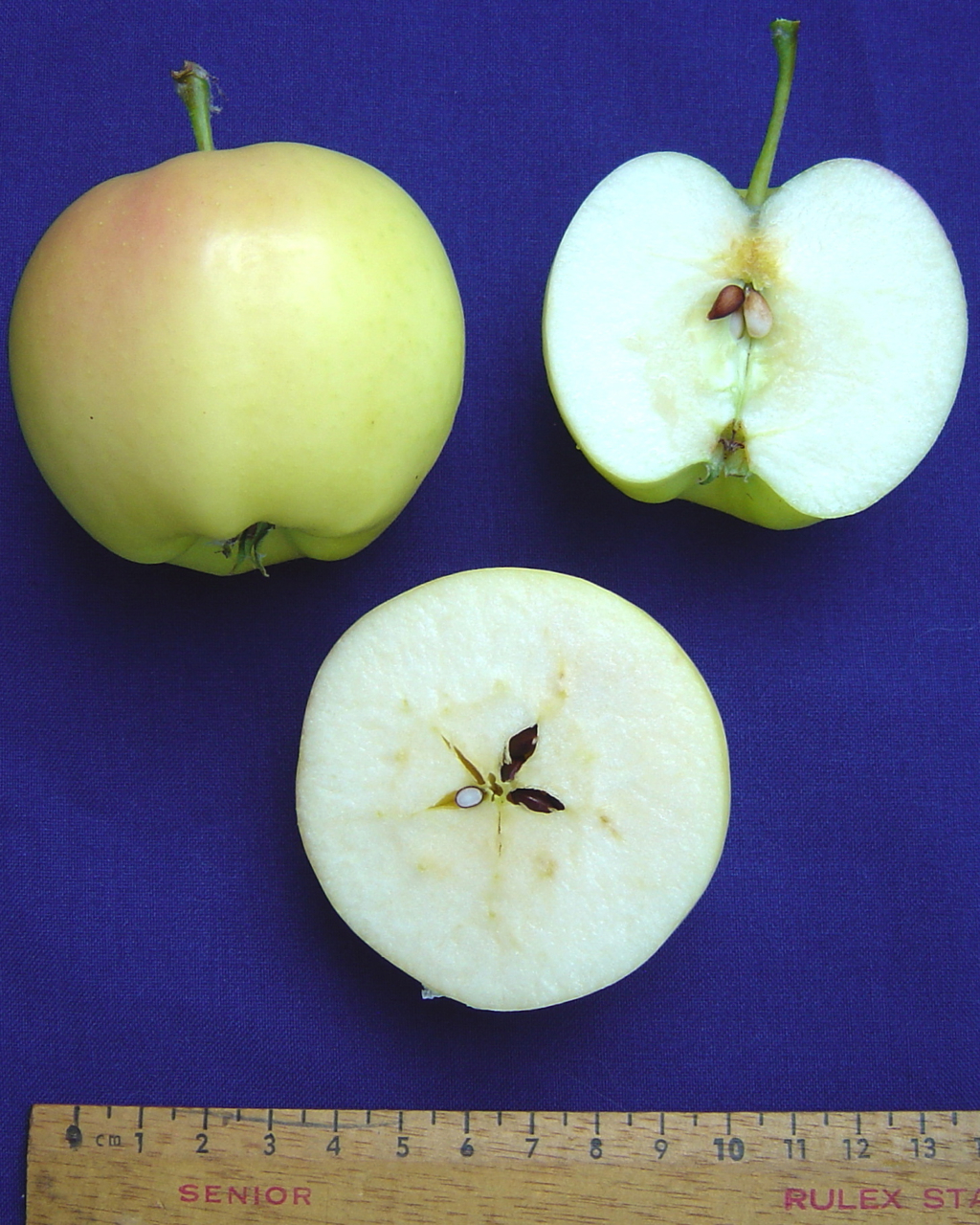
- 'Pristine' apple, whole and sectioned
- Hybrid parentage: 'Co Op 10' x 'Camuzat'
- Cultivar: 'Pristine'
- Origin: Indiana, United States in 1994

Pristine apple is a hybrid cultivar of 'Co Op 10' x 'Camuzat' domesticated apples, which are descendants of the 'McIntosh' apple and the 'Starking Delicious'. This cultivar was developed and patented in the United States by the PRI disease resistant apple breeding program, in Indiana, United States in 1994, for its resistance to apple scab. It is susceptible to cedar-apple rust.

== Description & use ==
Tree has a biennial tendency, is diploid, with average vigor. Flowering at mid-late season. Like other domesticated apples, it is self-sterile and needs cross pollination.

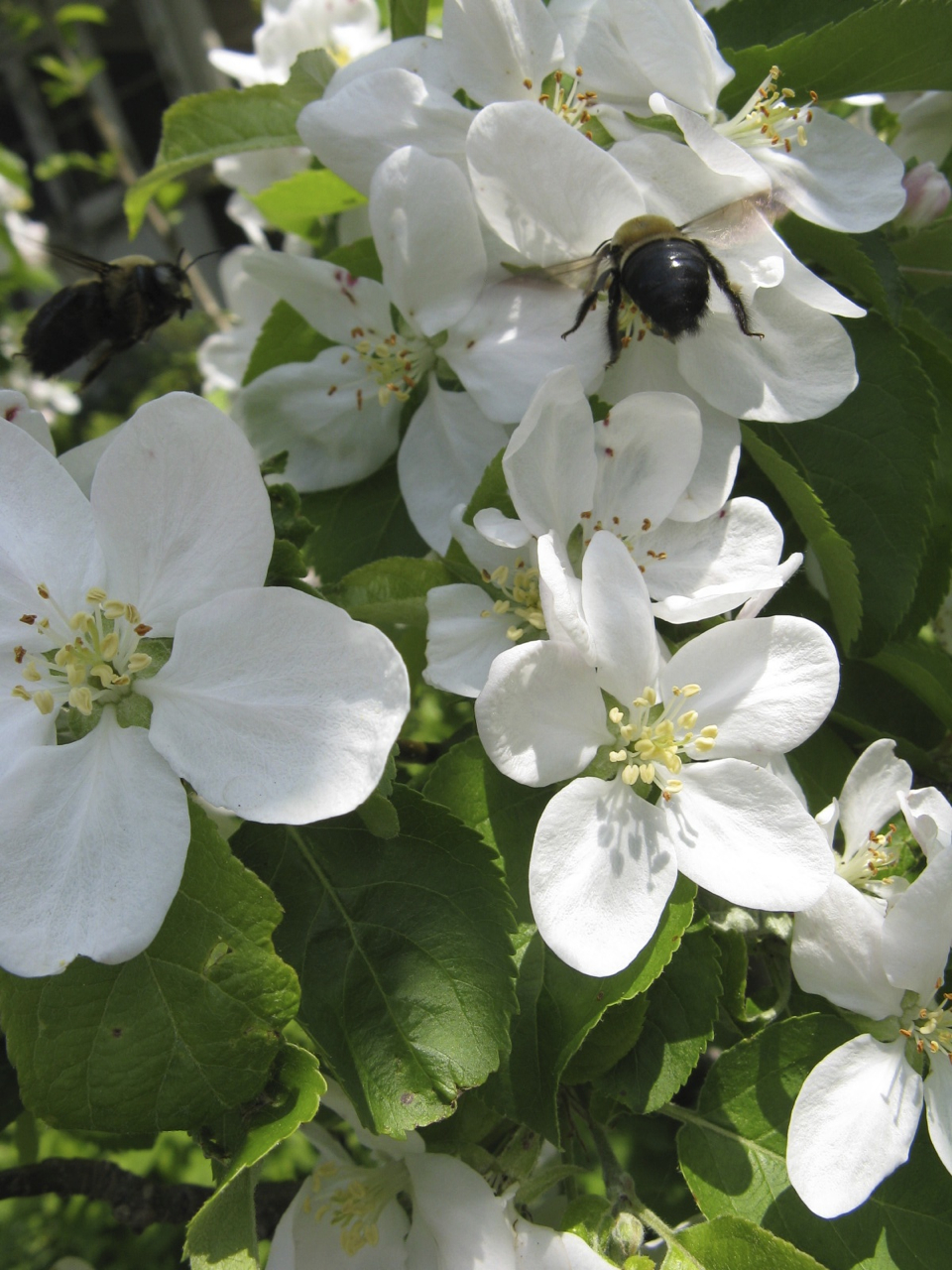
'Pristine' flowers are pollinated by bees.

Gives a good crop of medium-sized yellow skinned fruits, sometimes with red flush. Flesh colour is also yellowish. Very good flavor for fresh eating.

'Pristine' is harvested at early season and is considered of very good flavor for an early harvest apple. The flavour is somewhat tart. It does not keep fresh very long.

== Resistance ==
- Scab - Very resistant
- Mildew - Some resistance
- Fireblight - Some susceptibility
- Cedar apple rust - Some susceptibility

== See also ==
- List of apple cultivars
- Enterprise (apple)
