= Topaz (apple) =

Apple cultivar

Malus 'Topaz'
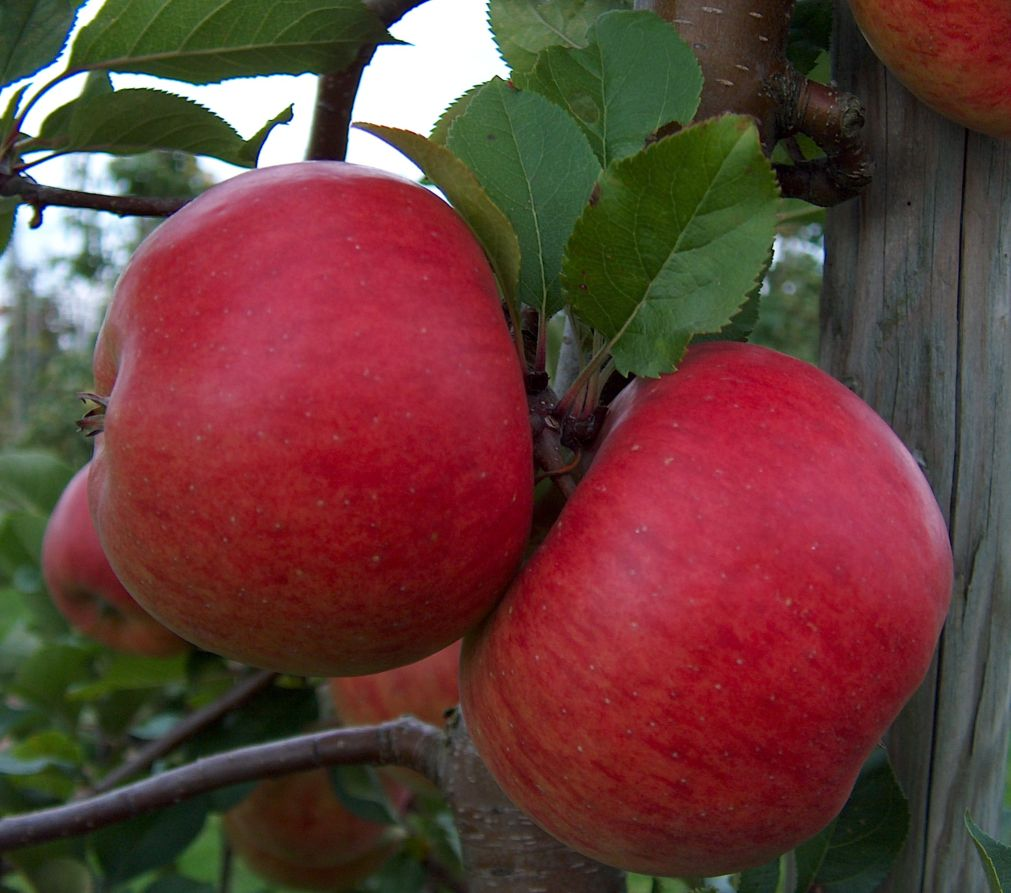
- Hybrid parentage: Rubín x Vanda
- Cultivar: 'Topaz'
- Origin: Czech Republic

Topaz is a cultivar of dessert apple that was developed in Czech Republic by the Institute of Experimental Botany for scab resistance. According to Orange Pippin it is "one of the best modern disease-resistant varieties, with fairly sharp flavour".

== See also ==
- Applecrab
- Opal (apple) – descendant
- Rajka (apple)
