= Applecrab =

Fruit hybrid between apples and crabapples

Applecrabs are various hybrids between crabapples and apples. They are bred for varying reasons, including disease resistance and use in cold climates because they are often hardier than apple trees and their fruit has the good eating qualities of apples.

Applecrabs are sometimes distinguished from apples if the fruit diameter is less than 5 cm (2 in).

== Cold-hardy applecrabs ==
Director of the Canadian Central Experimental Farm William Saunders (1836–1914) produced a number of such hybrids as part of an effort to develop good-quality eating apples for the Canadian prairies by crossing the domesticated apple cultivars with selected winter-hardy crabapple species.

Cultivars include:

- Malus 'Columbia' is from one of Saunders' early experiments crossing M. baccata (from Siberia) with relatively hardy apples.
- Malus 'Kerr' is from crossing 'Dolgo' crabapple and 'Haralson' apple.
- Malus 'Osman' is from one of Saunders' early experiments crossing M. baccata with relatively hardy apples.
- Malus 'Rescue'
- Malus 'Trailman' is from crossing 'Trail' with 'Osman'.

== Scab-resistant apples ==
A separate project was initiated by C.S. Crandall of the University of Illinois to breed scab-resistant apples by introducing the VF gene from the crabapple Malus floribunda. His work has been continued by the PRI disease resistant apple breeding program with great success.

Among the scab-resistant apples that carry the VF gene are:

- 'Pristine apple'
- 'Rajka'
- 'Topaz'

== Red-fleshed applecrabs ==
Another type of applecrab breeding program stems from Malus niedzwetskyana, a red-fleshed crabapple, a few of which can still be found in Siberia and the Caucasus. It has been used by modern breeders to breed some red-leaved, red-flowered, and red-fruited domesticated apples and crabapples. One example is 'Surprise', a pink-fleshed apple that was brought to the United States by German immigrants around 1840 and was later used by horticulturist Albert Etter to breed some 30 pink- and red-fleshed varieties, the best-known of which is 'Pink Pearl'.

Another horticulturist, Niels Ebbesen Hansen, encountered M. niedzwetskyana in the Ili valley in what is now Kazakhstan during his 1897 expedition to Russia, and began two breeding programs based on this unusual fruit, one aimed at developing a cold-hardy cooking and eating apple and the other aimed at developing ornamental crabapples. His efforts resulted in the 'Almata' apple and the 'Hopa' crabapple, among other varieties. Some of these apples, as well as M. niedzwetskyana itself, are being used for small-scale commercial production of rosé apple ciders.

== See also ==
- Backcrossing
- Cider apple
- 'Crimson Gold'
- Wealthy (apple)
- Wijcik McIntosh
