= Bicolored apple =

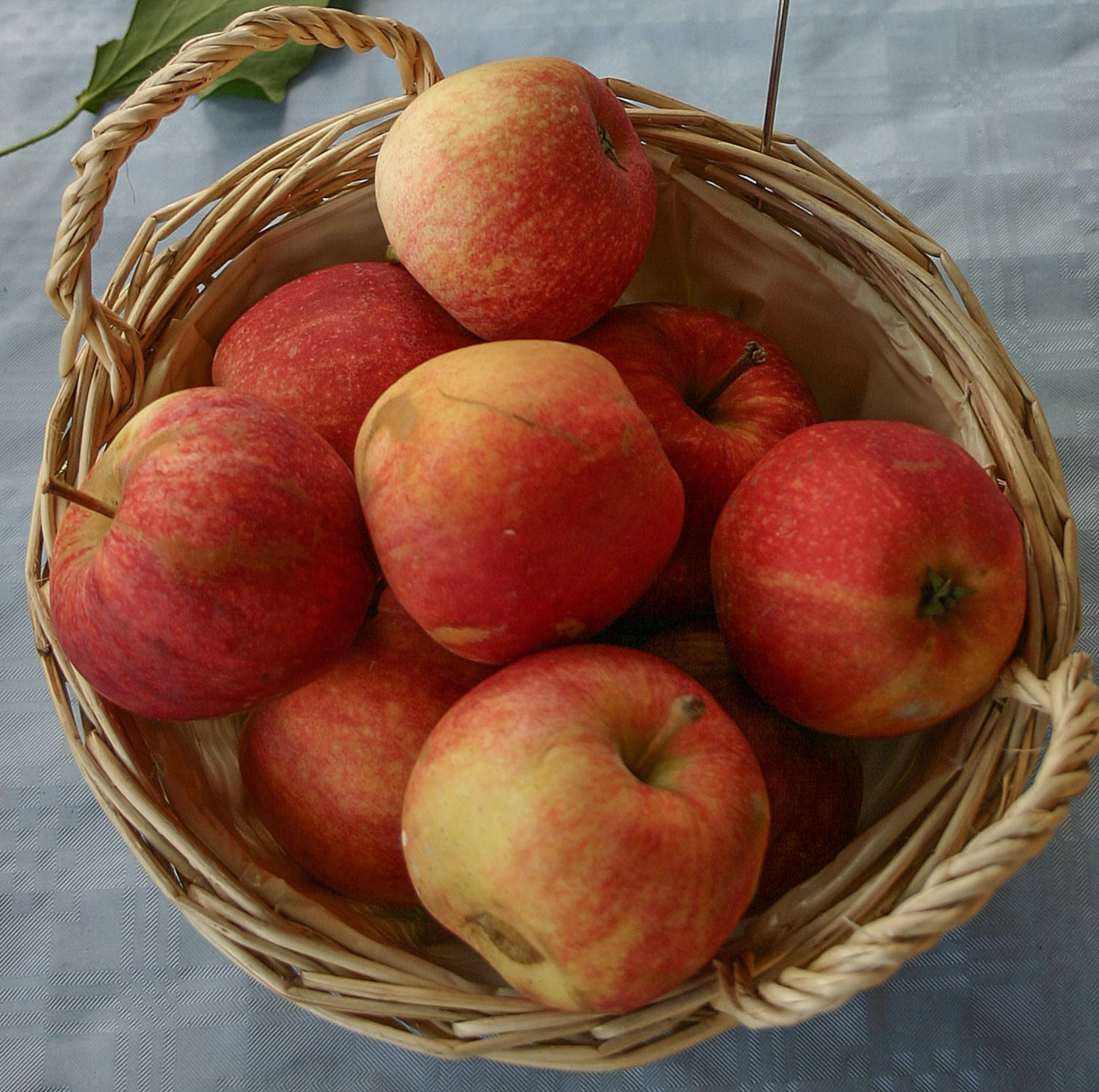
Gala

Bicolored apple is a popular definition in the horticultural branch referring to apples characterized by a non-uniform skin color. Main cultivations are produced in Europe. The varieties considered to be bicolored include Gala, Champion, Idared, Ligol, Jonagored, Najdared and Gloster.

== Color and taste ==
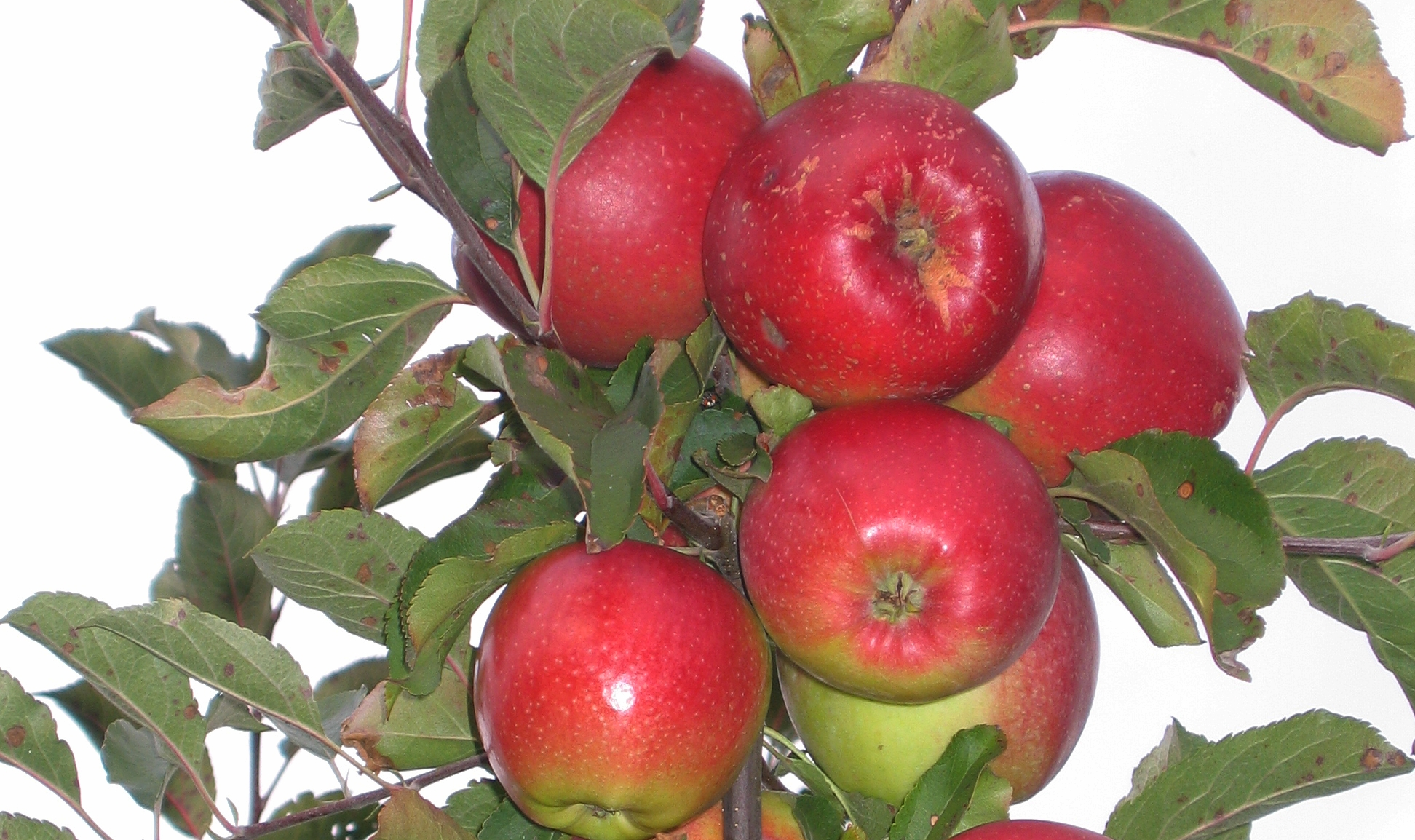
Ligol

Apple color depends on many factors, which include weather conditions at the time of fruit ripening, temperature fluctuations between the day and night cycles, good insolation, and the soil composition.

Bicolored apples that grow in certain regions of Europe, such as Grójec, are also characterized by a slight note of sourness, which results from the specific weather conditions, namely the ground frost occurring in that area during the autumn crop collection.

== Consumer preference studies ==
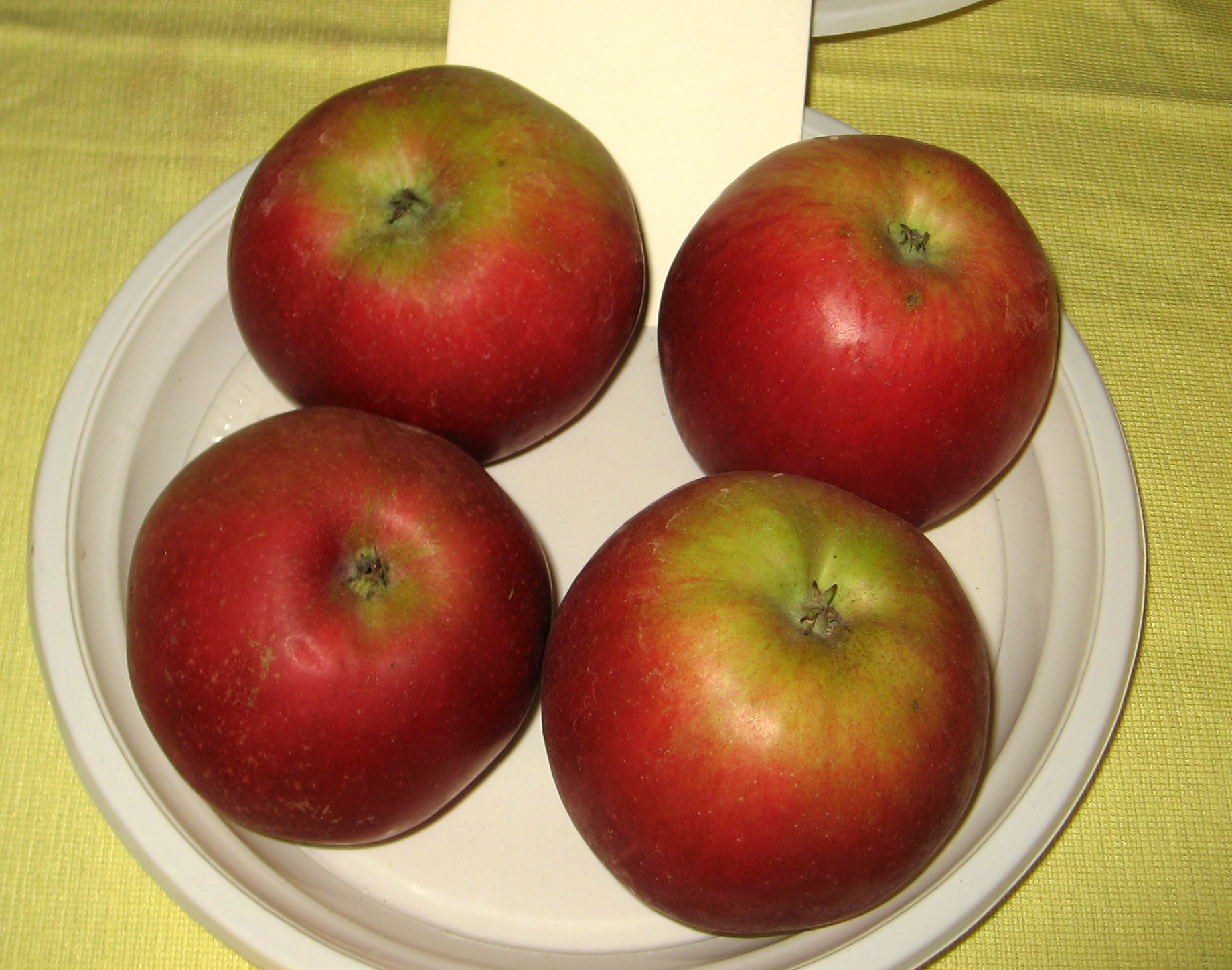
Idared

In June 2014, European Fruit Magazine published the results of studies conducted by Katrin Korsten from the Niederrhein University of Applied Sciences in Germany. The object of the research was to determine whether European consumers prefer a specific apple color.

Based on that research, bicolored apples proved to be more popular than monocolored ones. However, there was shown to be no difference in preference between apples that are red and green or red and yellow. For example, a combination of red and yellow was associated with such terms as sweetness, freshness, juiciness, natural, and harmony. In contrast, they associated a full dark red color with mealiness and judged them as artificial and unnatural.
