= Opal (apple) =

Apple cultivar

opal®
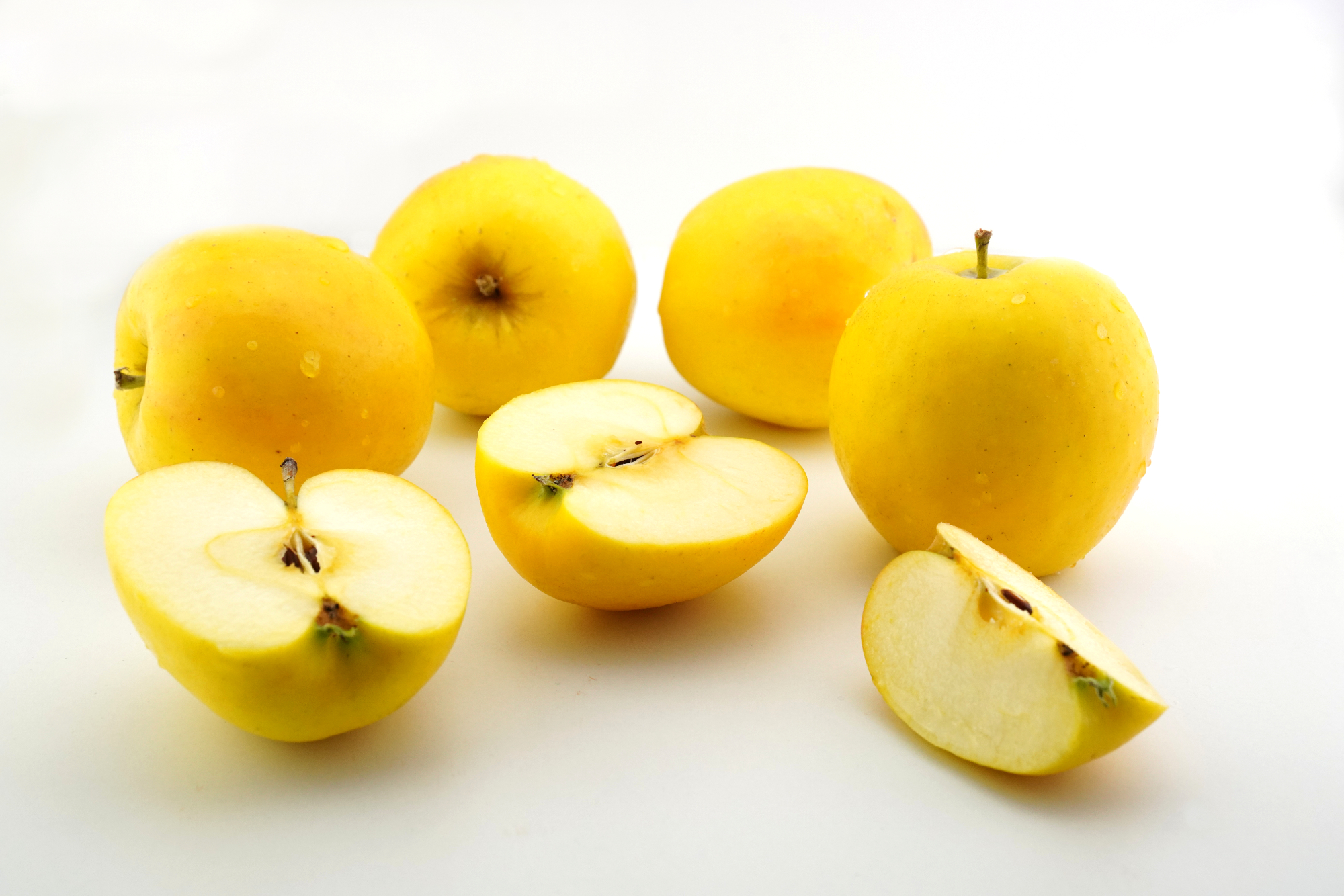
- Hybrid parentage: 'Golden Delicious' x 'Topaz'
- Cultivar: 'UEB 32642'
- Origin: Czech Republic

Opal is the brand name for apple cultivar 'UEB 32642'. The variety originates from a natural crossing of 'Golden Delicious' with 'Topaz'.

Developed by the Institute of Experimental Botany in Prague, it is grown by FirstFruits Farms LLC in Washington and marketed by FirstFruits Marketing.

It is also cultivated in Austria, Italy, Spain, Germany, Slovenia, France and the United Kingdom. 'UEB 32642' is a variety registered at the Community Plant Variety Office of the European Union under EU N°: 16749.

This variety of apple is naturally low in polyphenol oxidase and is often sold pre-sliced.
