= Champion (apple) =

Apple cultivar

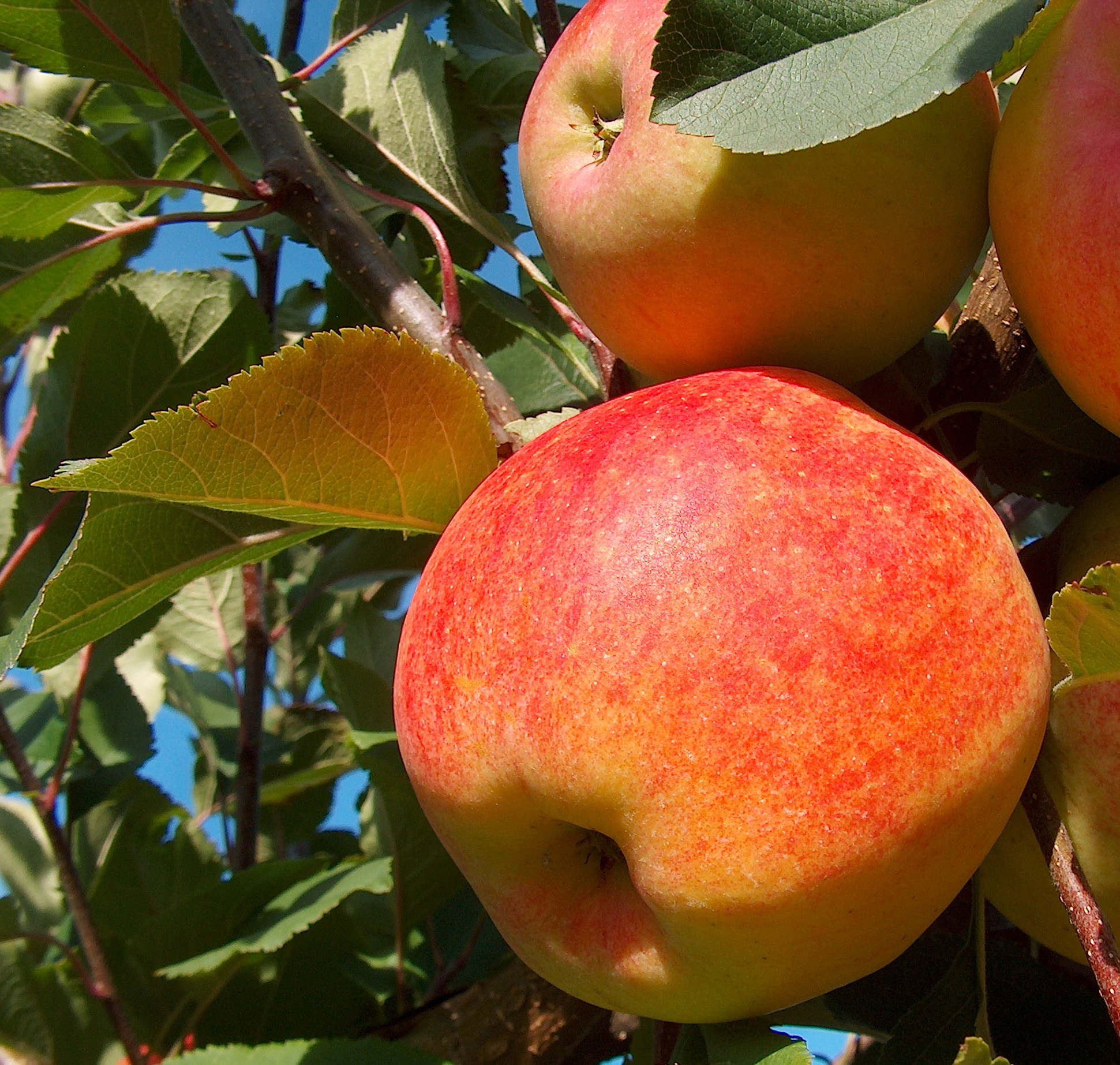
Champion apple

Champion, shampion, or sampion is a hybrid cultivar of domesticated apple developed c. 1960 in Czechoslovakia by crossing a Golden Delicious and a Cox's Orange Pippin. The fruit has a non-uniform skin color.

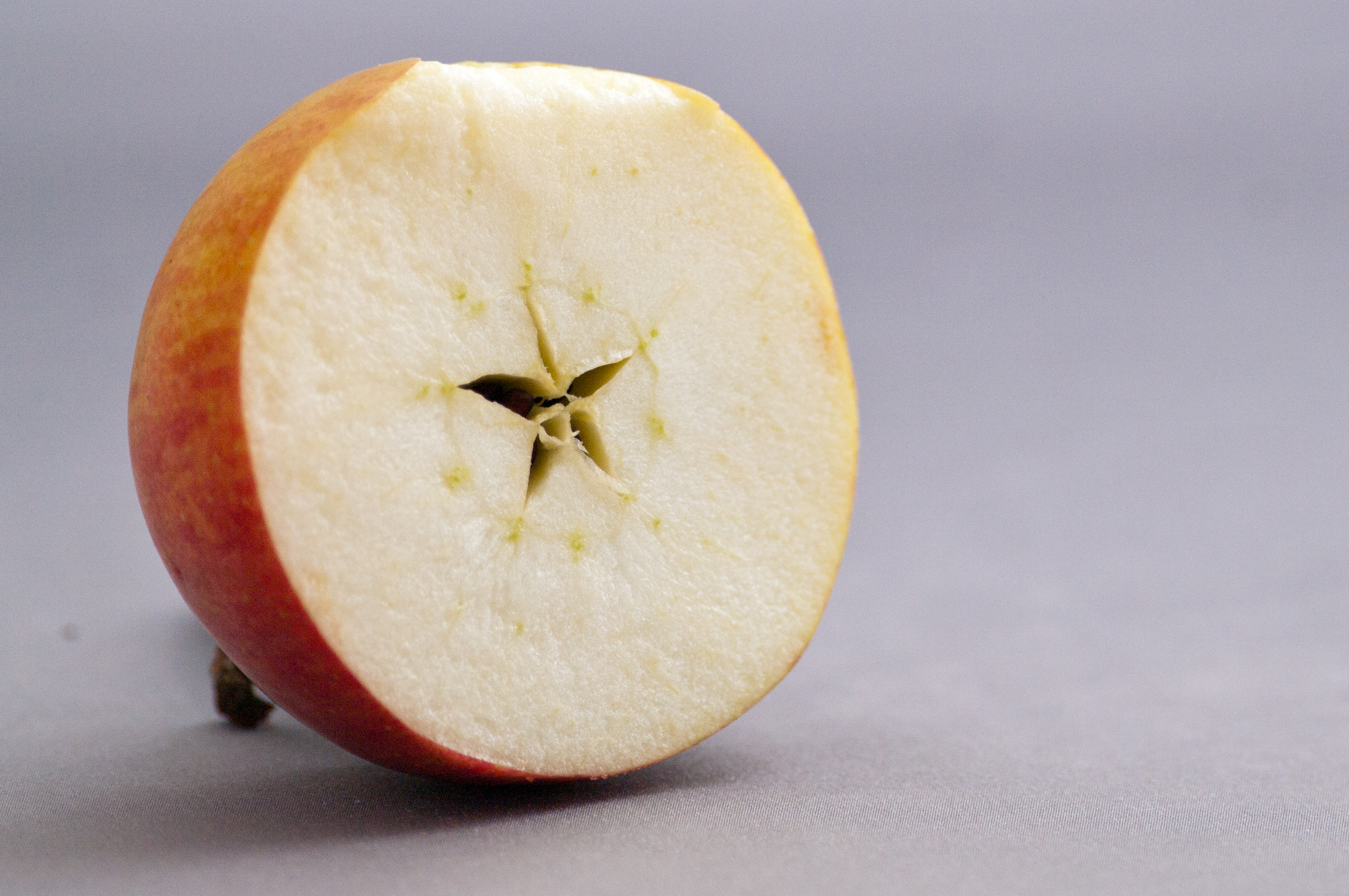
Cross section

== See also ==
- Rajka (apple)
