= Rajka (apple) =

Apple cultivar

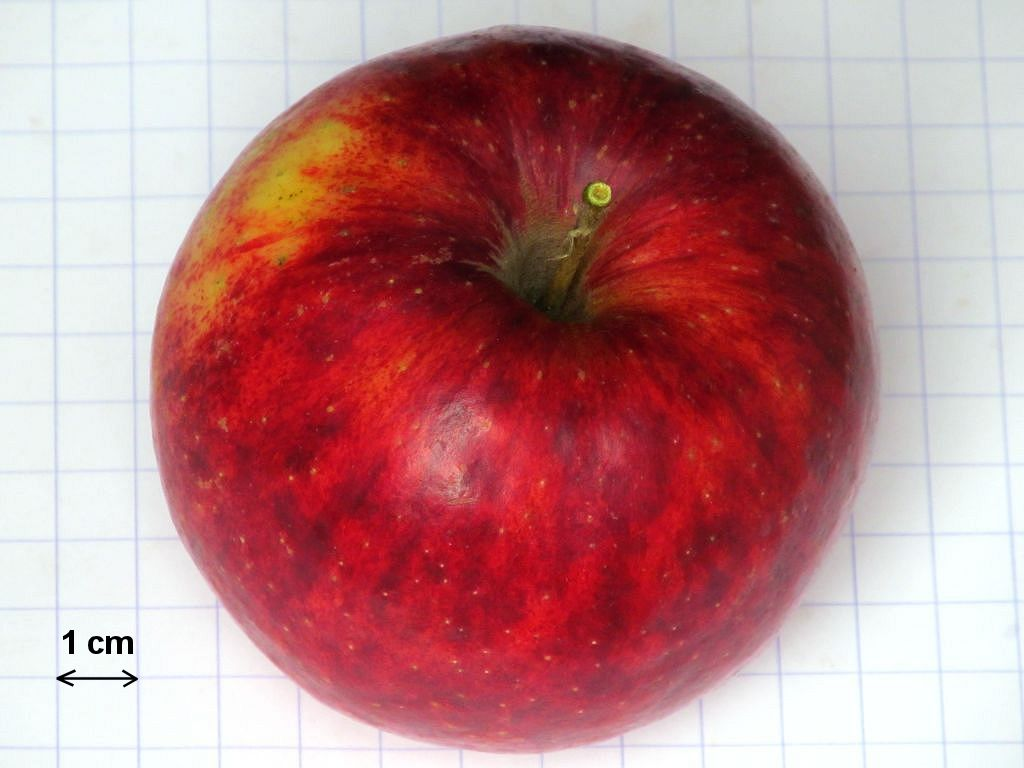
- Hybrid parentage: Champion (apple) × UEB 1200/1
- Cultivar: Rajka
- Origin: Czech Republic

Rajka is a hybrid cultivar of domesticated apple from the Czech Republic, specifically for eating. It was crossed and developed by the Institute of Experimental Botany from the Champion and Katka apples for scab resistance and is possible to grow according to organic standards.

== Description ==
The tree from which the Rajka apple is grown is moderately vigorous, standard-type, produces spurs freely, precocious in cropping, and highly productive. The fruits do not fall prematurely, it is an easy pollinator with mid-season blossoming, and is resistant to scab and tolerant to powdery mildew.

Fruits are medium-to-large, globose and conical, of medium stem length. The yellow under-color is covered on almost the entire skin surface with a bright red over-color. There is some russeting in the stem cavity, which may occasionally extend over the base. The flesh is yellowish, juicy, with medium-grained texture and a distinctive, pleasant aroma.

Overall, it is an early-winter, disease-resistant, dessert-variety apple with outstanding color, rather sweet flavor, and medium storage life. It may also be suited to cooler areas. It has no specific requirements for rootstocks and is suitable for commercial orchards as well as for home gardens.

== See also ==
- List of apple cultivars
- Topaz (apple)
