= PRI disease resistant apple breeding program =

Apple breeding project

The PRI disease resistant apple breeding program is a joint project of the Purdue University, Rutgers University, and the University of Illinois, to breed apple cultivars to be resistant to apple scab. The initialism stands for the three involved universities: Purdue, Rutgers and Illinois.

== Formation ==
During the early 20th century, C. S. Crandall carried out intensive studies of crosses between the cultivated apples and crab apples, with the goal of scab resistance. However, Crandall didn't see any fruits of his investigations. L. Fredric Hough, then a graduate student at the University of Illinois, studied Crandall's work. Hough published a paper in 1944, leading to a 1945 collaboration with Purdue University pathologist J. Ralph Shay. Hough then relocated to Rutgers and the collaborative effort was extended there.

== The program ==
The modified backcross breeding strategy used cultivated apple with recurrent parents from selected susceptible members of the wild ancestral genus malus. Several Malus species were screened and utilized to incorporate their resistance factors into the more advanced pomological backgrounds.

== Success ==
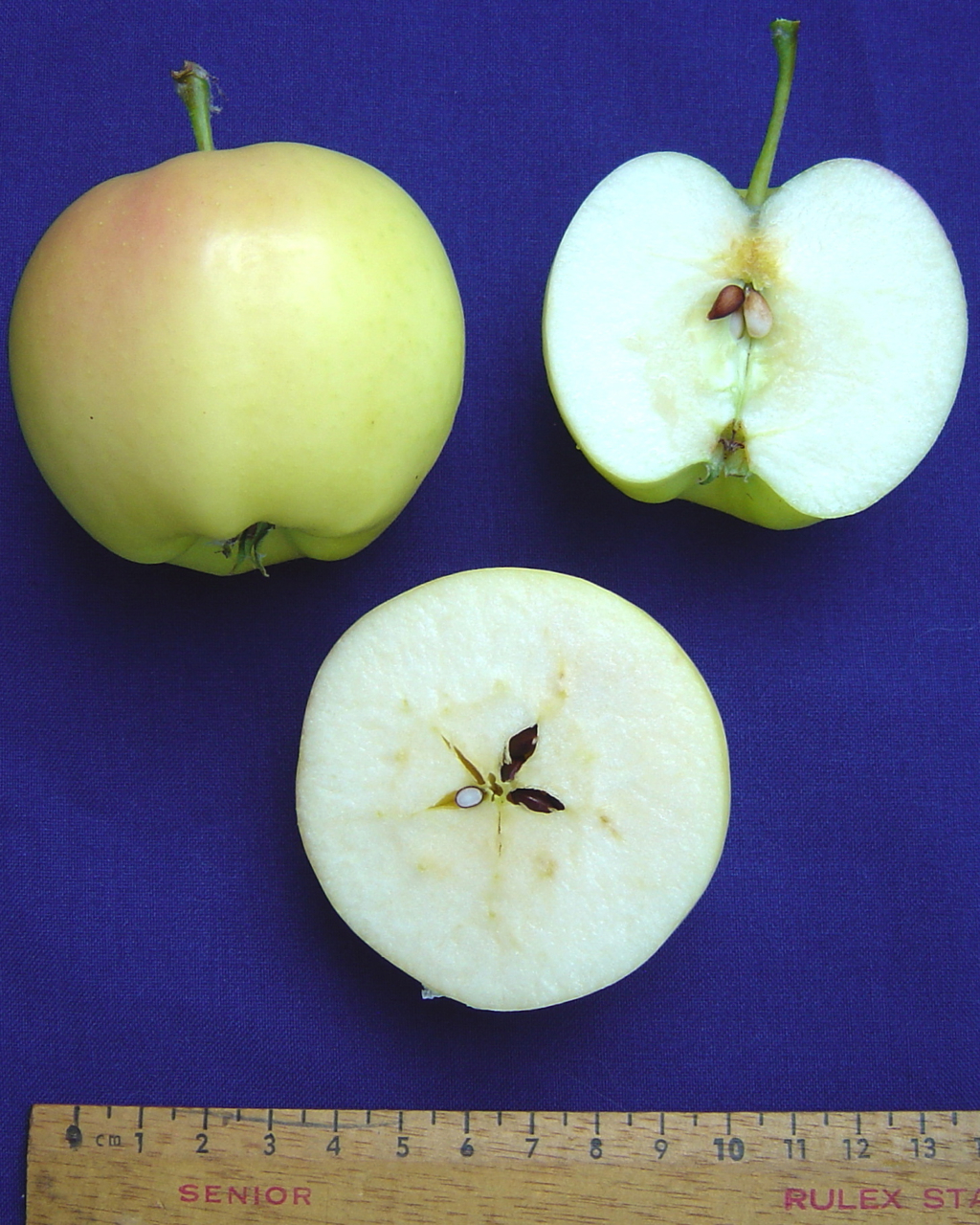
Pristine apple, is one of the scab-resistant cultivars, to be developed by "PRI", hence its name "PRI"stine.

By 2000, the PRI have already released a total of eighteen apple cultivars, containing the scab-resistant Vf gene derived from Malus floribunda 821. Fifty-some PRI germplasm cultivars have also been released worldwide.

== See also ==
- Applecrab
- Pristine apple
- Enterprise (apple)
- Prima apple
