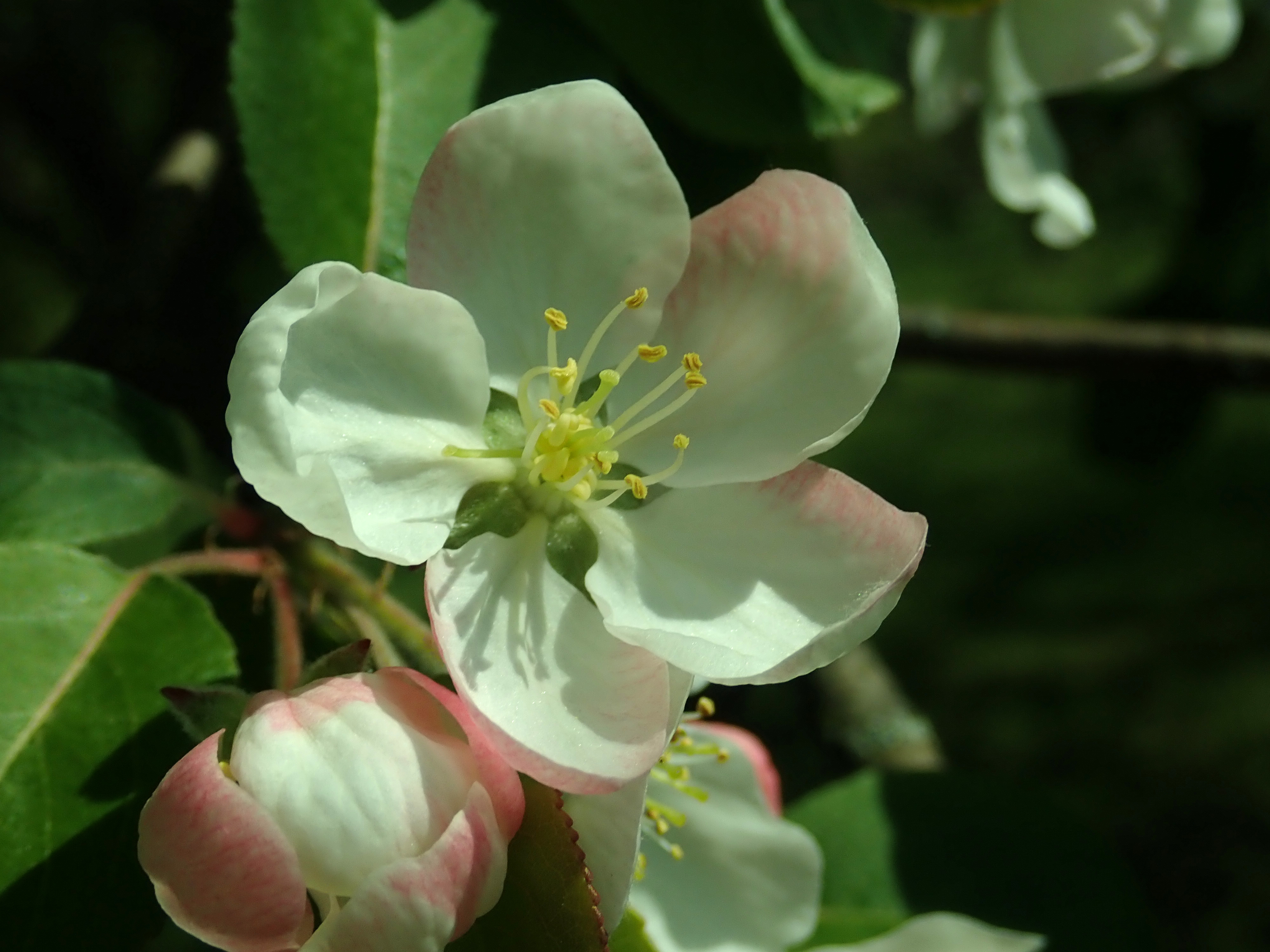

Scientific classification
- Kingdom: Plantae
- Clade: Tracheophytes
- Clade: Angiosperms
- Clade: Eudicots
- Clade: Rosids
- Order: Rosales
- Family: Rosaceae
- Genus: Malus
- Species: M. mandshurica

Binomial name
- Malus mandshurica (Maxim.) Kom.

= Malus mandshurica =

Species of apple tree

Malus mandshurica, or the Manchurian crab apple, is a species of Malus found in China, far eastern Russia, North Korea, and Japan. Some authorities consider it to be a variety of the Siberian crab apple, Malus baccata. It is used as a rootstock for cultivated apples in China.
