= Rome apple =

Apple cultivar

Rome
- Species: Malus domestica
- Hybrid parentage: Chance seedling
- Cultivar: Rome
- Marketing names: Red Rome; Rome Beauty; Gillett's Seedling
- Origin: (United States) Rome Township, Ohio, 1816

The Rome apple—also known as Red Rome, Rome Beauty, Gillett's Seedling—is a variety of apple from Proctorville, Rome Township, Ohio, United States, in the early nineteenth century. This apple remains popular for its glossy red color and for its utility in baking and cooking.

== Characteristics ==
The Rome Beauty is a late-blooming variety, medium to large in size. It has a rounded shape, thick and glossy skin, that is red on the sun-exposed side. Its flesh is firm, coarse, and juicy. It holds its shape well when cooked.

It may also be used in salads and for making applesauce, if used with a sweeter variety, such as the Golden Delicious.

=== Chemical composition ===
Sugar 14.2%, acid 0.60%, tannin 0.05%, pectine 0.30%.

=== Disease susceptibility ===
- Scab: high
- Powdery mildew: high
- Cedar-apple rust: high
- Fire blight: high

== History ==
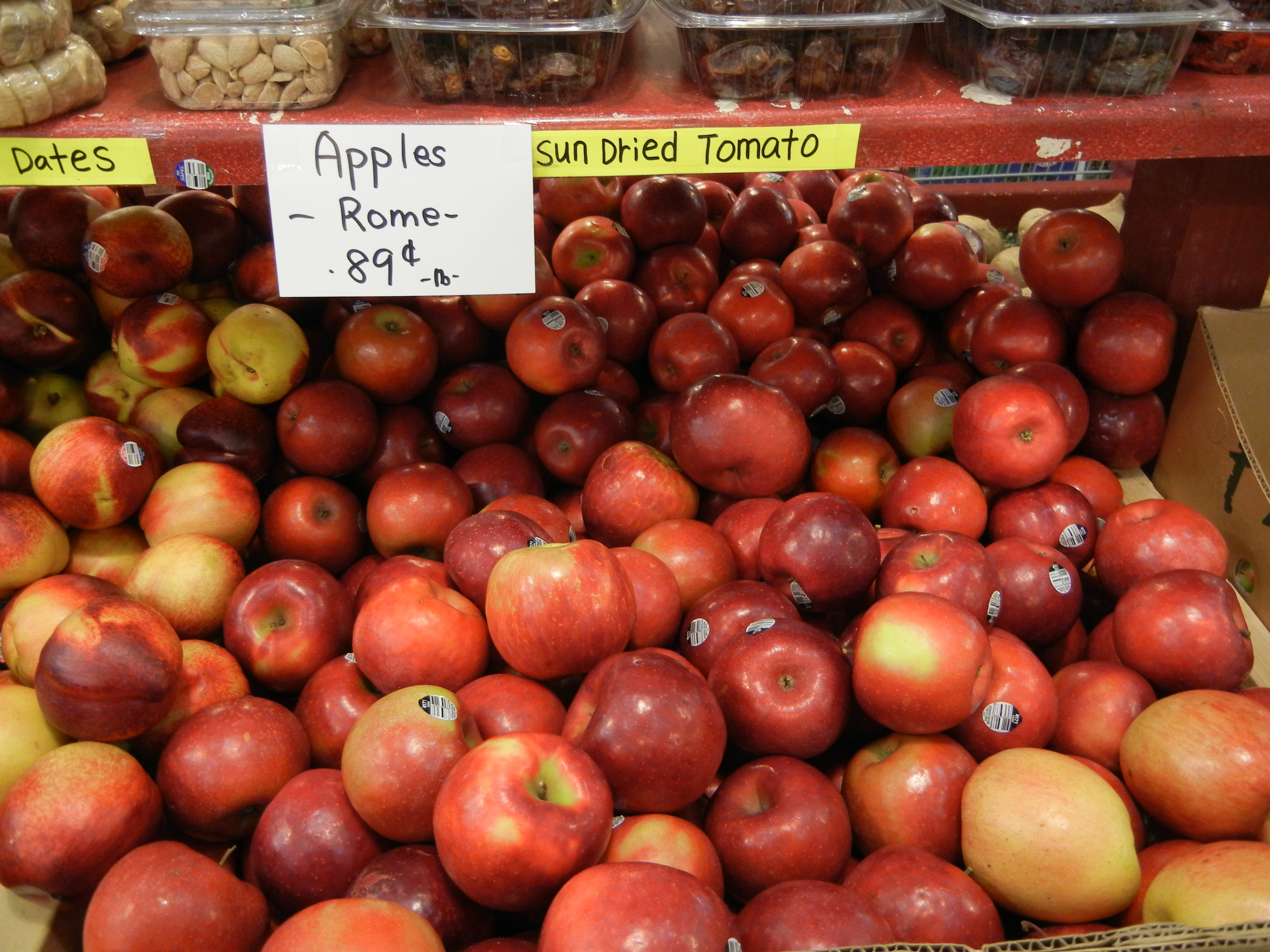
Rome apples for sale at a farmer's market in Newark, Delaware.

In 1816 Joel Gillet (also spelled "Gillett" or "Gillette" by his descendants) of Proctorville, Ohio, purchased grafted trees from Putnam Nursery and spotted an unknown variety of apple. He gave his son, Alanson, who planted the tree on the banks of the Ohio River, where several years later it was found producing red fruit. This variety was dubbed "Gillett's Seedling" originally, but was renamed the "Rome Beauty" in 1832 in honor of the township. The original tree survived until 1860, when it was washed away in a flood.

During the Great Depression, the Rome Beauty was a popular choice due to its attractive appearance, decent size, and reliability as an apple for baking and cooking, thanks to its flavor and its ability to hold its shape. Since then, it has overtaken a number of heirloom varieties such as Stayman and York.
