= Cultural control =

In agriculture cultural control is the practice of modifying the growing environment to reduce the prevalence of unwanted pests. Examples include changing soil pH or fertility levels, irrigation practices, amount of sunlight, temperature, or the use of beneficial animals (e.g. chickens) or insects (e.g. ladybugs) (biological control). Cultural control can help avoid pest population build-up, strengthen the overall resilience of a farming system and thereby reduce a need for curative interventions e.g., chemical pesticide applications. As such, a systematic implementation of cultural control practices can avert pesticide-induced detrimental effects on farmland biodiversity and the environment. Cultural control can involve the use of crop rotation, resistant varieties, tillage practice, regular weeding, fallowing, uprooting and burning infected crops.
