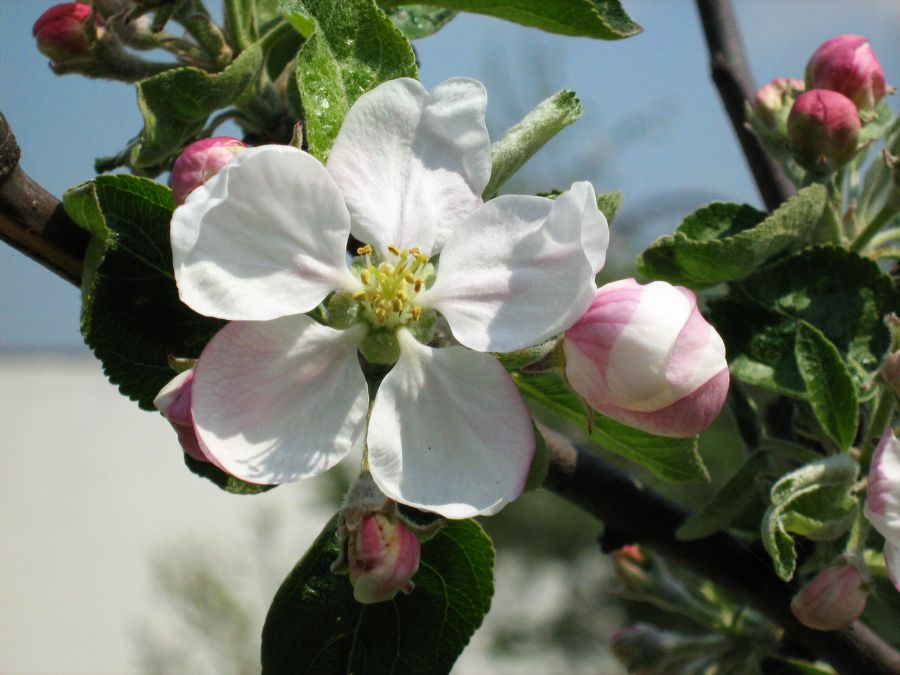

Conservation status
- Data Deficient (IUCN 3.1)

Scientific classification
- Kingdom: Plantae
- Clade: Tracheophytes
- Clade: Angiosperms
- Clade: Eudicots
- Clade: Rosids
- Order: Rosales
- Family: Rosaceae
- Genus: Malus
- Species: M. asiatica

Binomial name
- Malus asiatica Nakai

= Malus asiatica =

Species of plant

Malus asiatica, also known as neunggeum apple or Chinese pearleaf crabapple, is a species in the genus Malus under the family Rosaceae. It is native to China and Korea.
