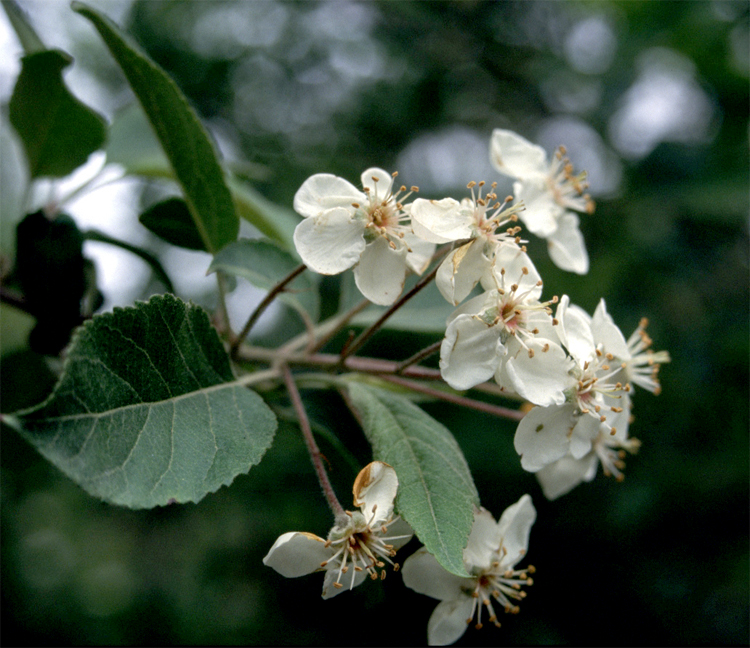
- Flowers and leaves at Humboldt Bay National Wildlife Refuge in California

Conservation status
- Least Concern (IUCN 3.1)

Scientific classification
- Kingdom: Plantae
- Clade: Embryophytes
- Clade: Tracheophytes
- Clade: Angiosperms
- Clade: Eudicots
- Clade: Rosids
- Order: Rosales
- Family: Rosaceae
- Genus: Malus
- Species: M. fusca

Binomial name
- Malus fusca (Raf.) C.K.Schneid.

Synonyms
- Synonymy: Malus diversifolia (Bong.) M.Roem.; Malus fusca var. levipes (Nutt.) C.K.Schneid.; Malus rivularis (Douglas ex Hook.) M.Roem.; Pyrus diversifolia Bong.; Pyrus fusca Raf. 1830; Pyrus fusea Raf.; Pyrus rivularis Douglas ex Hook.; Pyrus rivularis var. levipes Nutt.; Sorbus rivularis (Douglas ex Hook.) H.Hara

= Malus fusca =

Species of apple tree

Malus fusca, with the common names Oregon crabapple and Pacific crabapple, is a species of crabapple native to western North America.

== Description ==
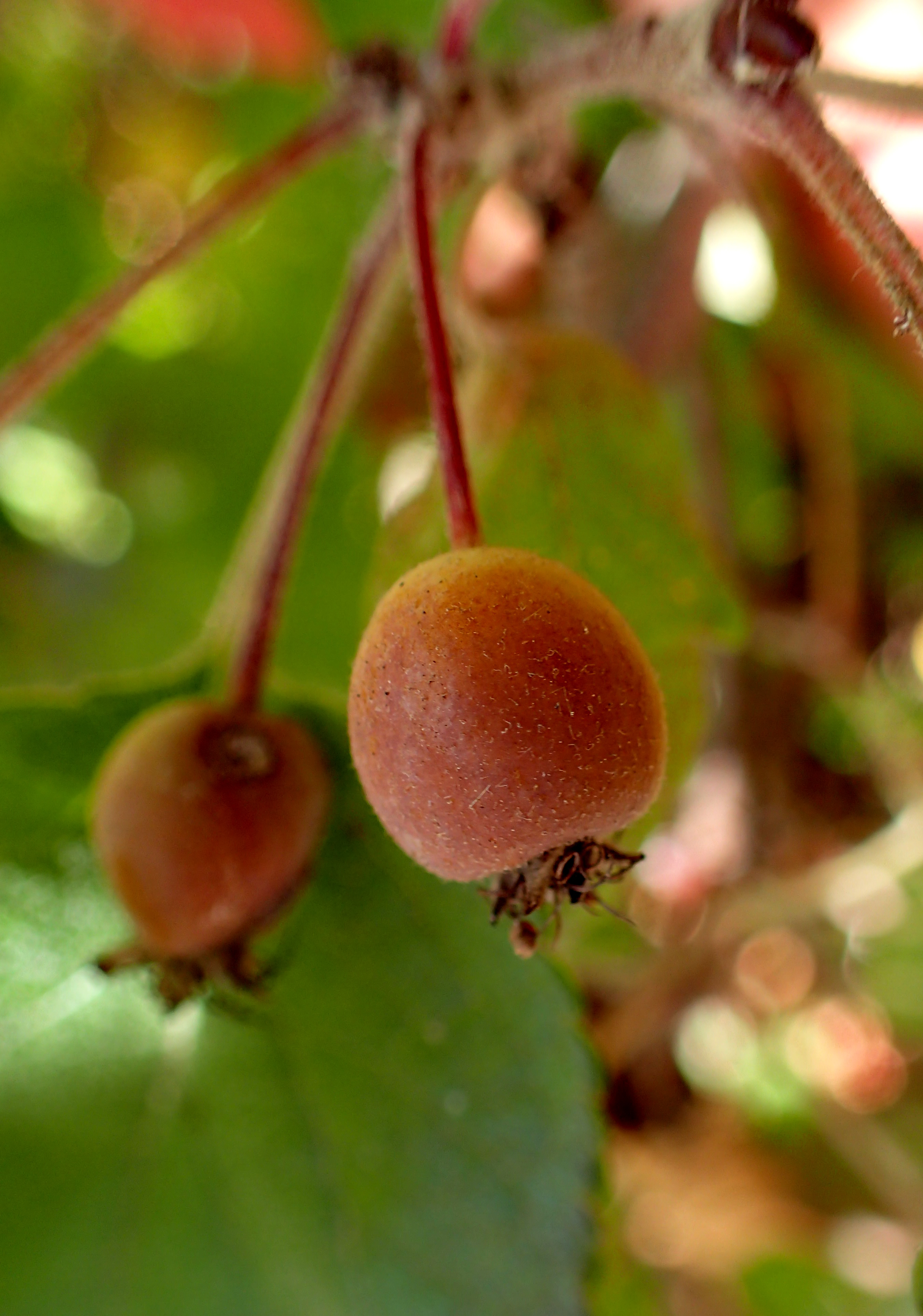
Fruit

Malus fusca is a deciduous tree growing up to 13 metres (43 feet) tall, with a trunk 20–25 centimetres (8–10 inches) thick. The leaves are 5–8 cm (2–3 in) long, dark green above, and both pale and fibrous beneath; they turn bright orange to red in autumn.

The flowers are white or pale pink, blooming in spring. The fruits are small round apple-shaped pomes, about 2 cm (3/4 in) long and from red to yellow-green in colour. They may stay on the tree until winter.

The trees can reach at least 100 years of age.

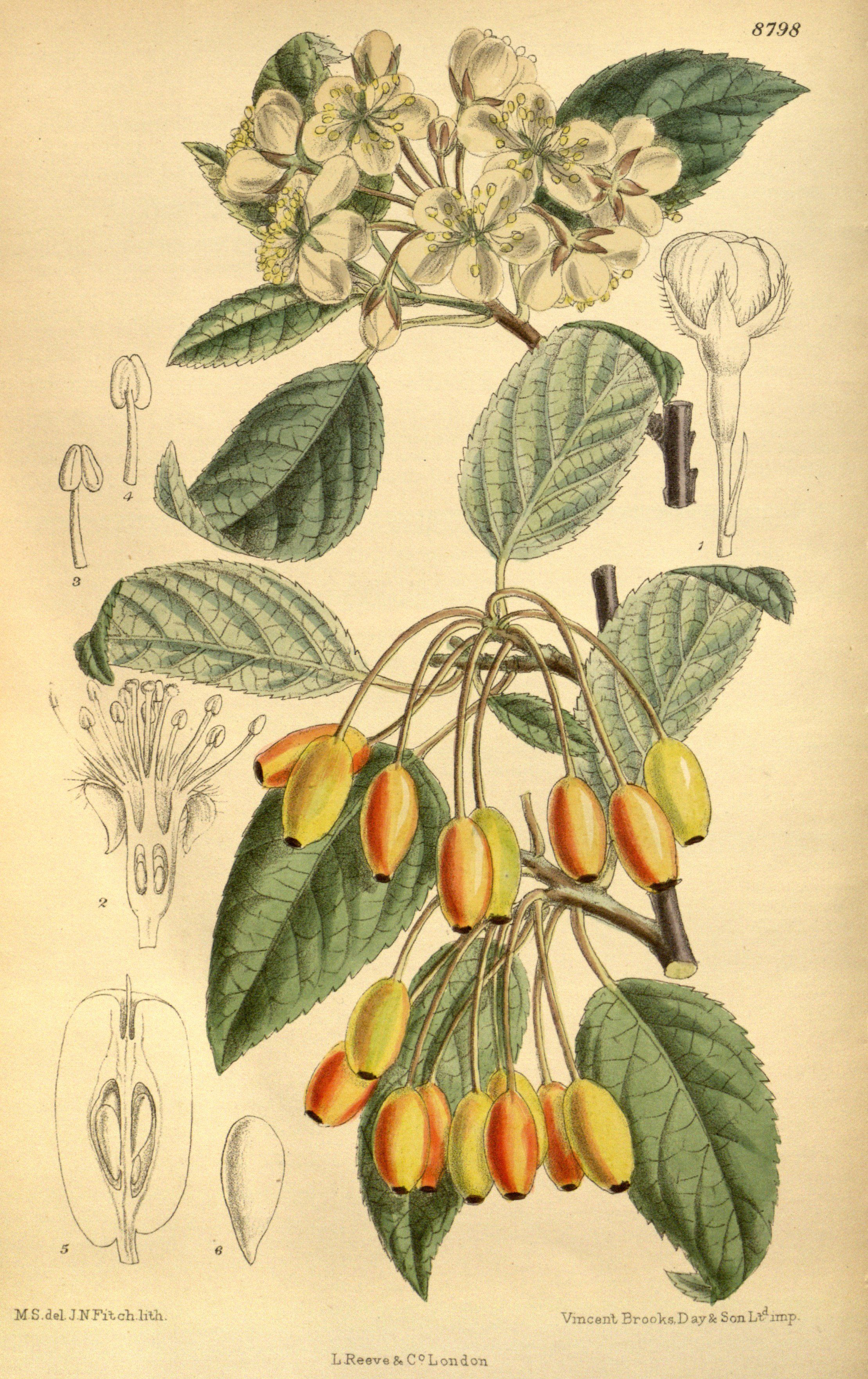
Botanical illustration

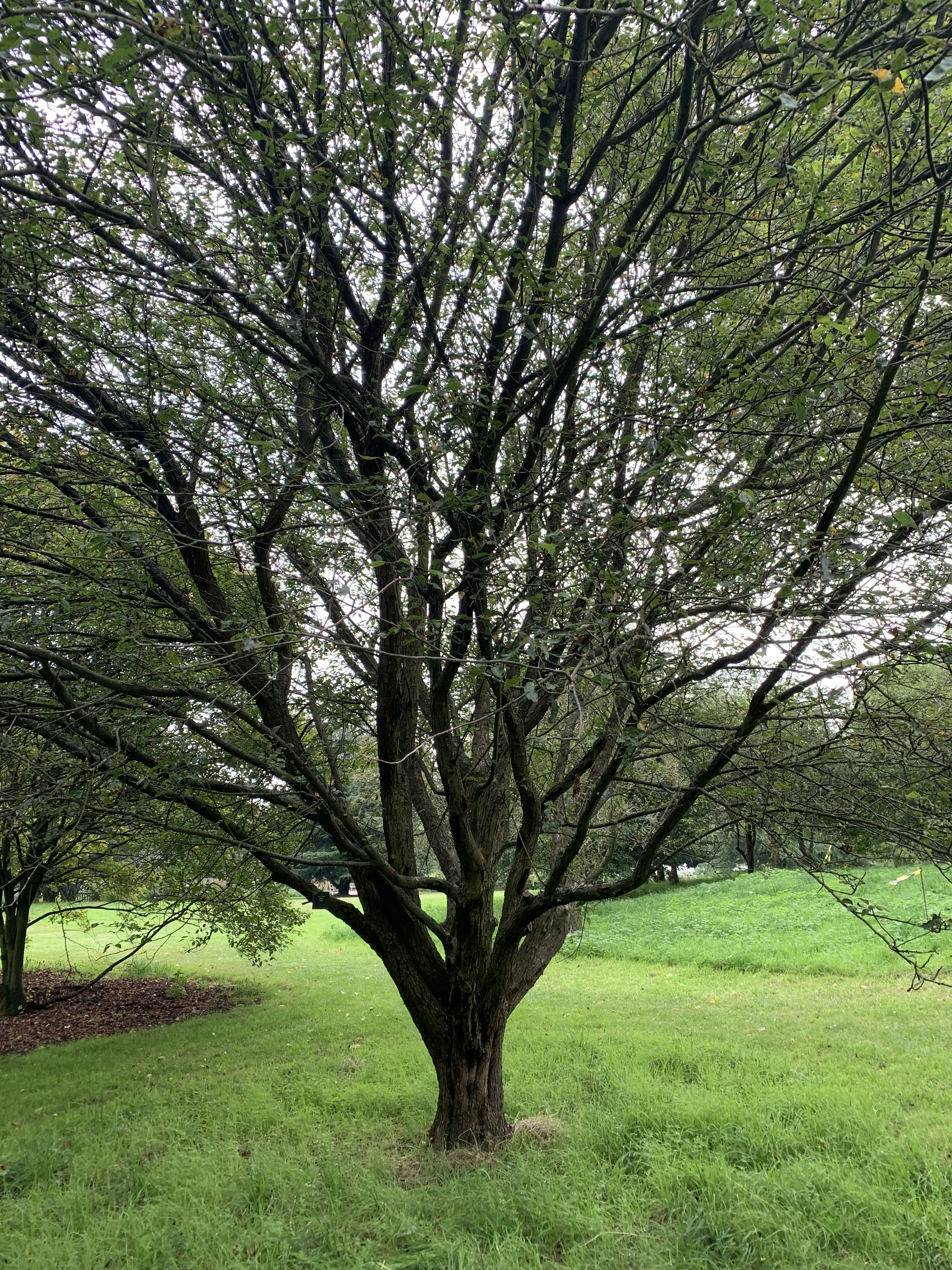
Tree at Royal Botanic Gardens, Kew

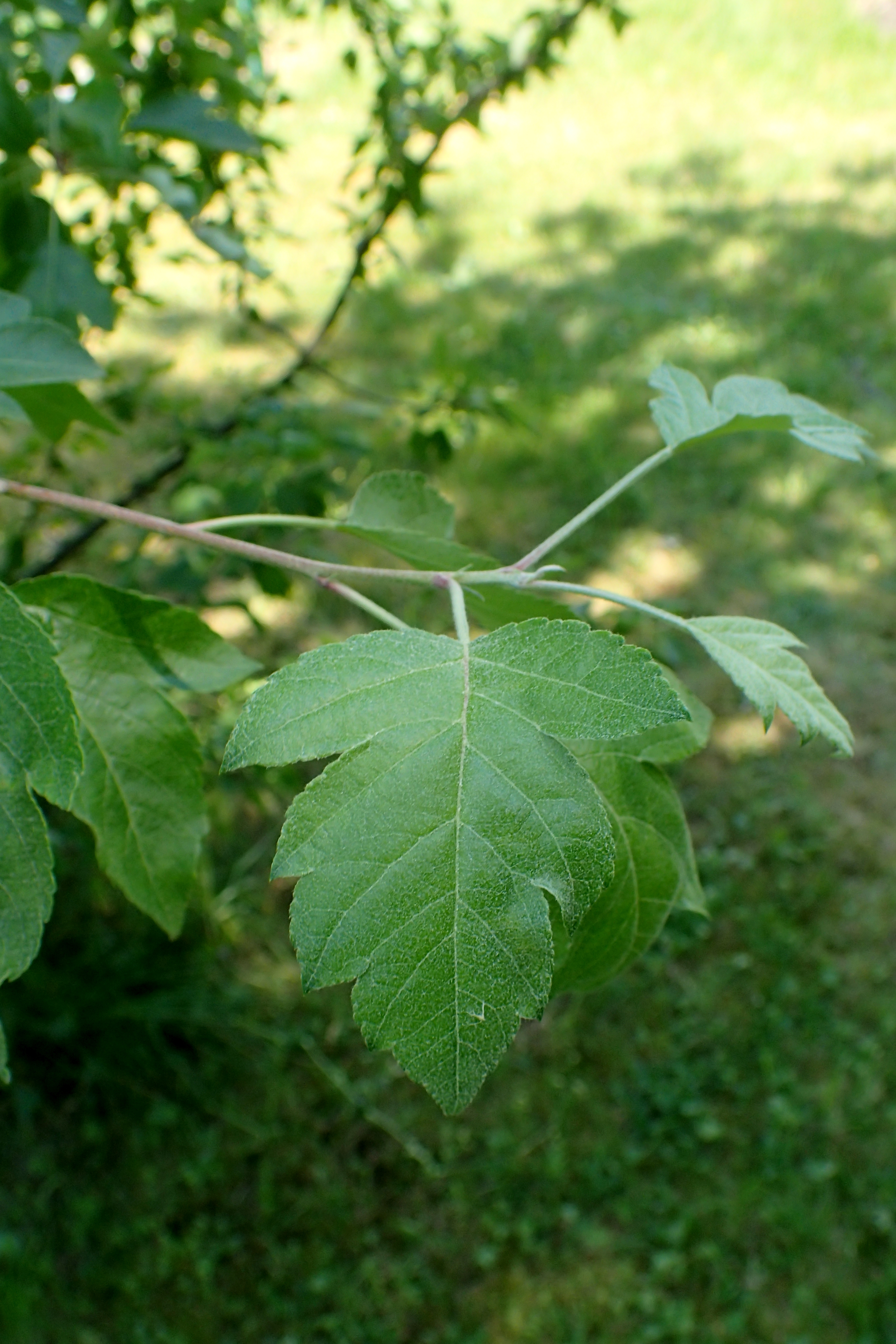
Leaves

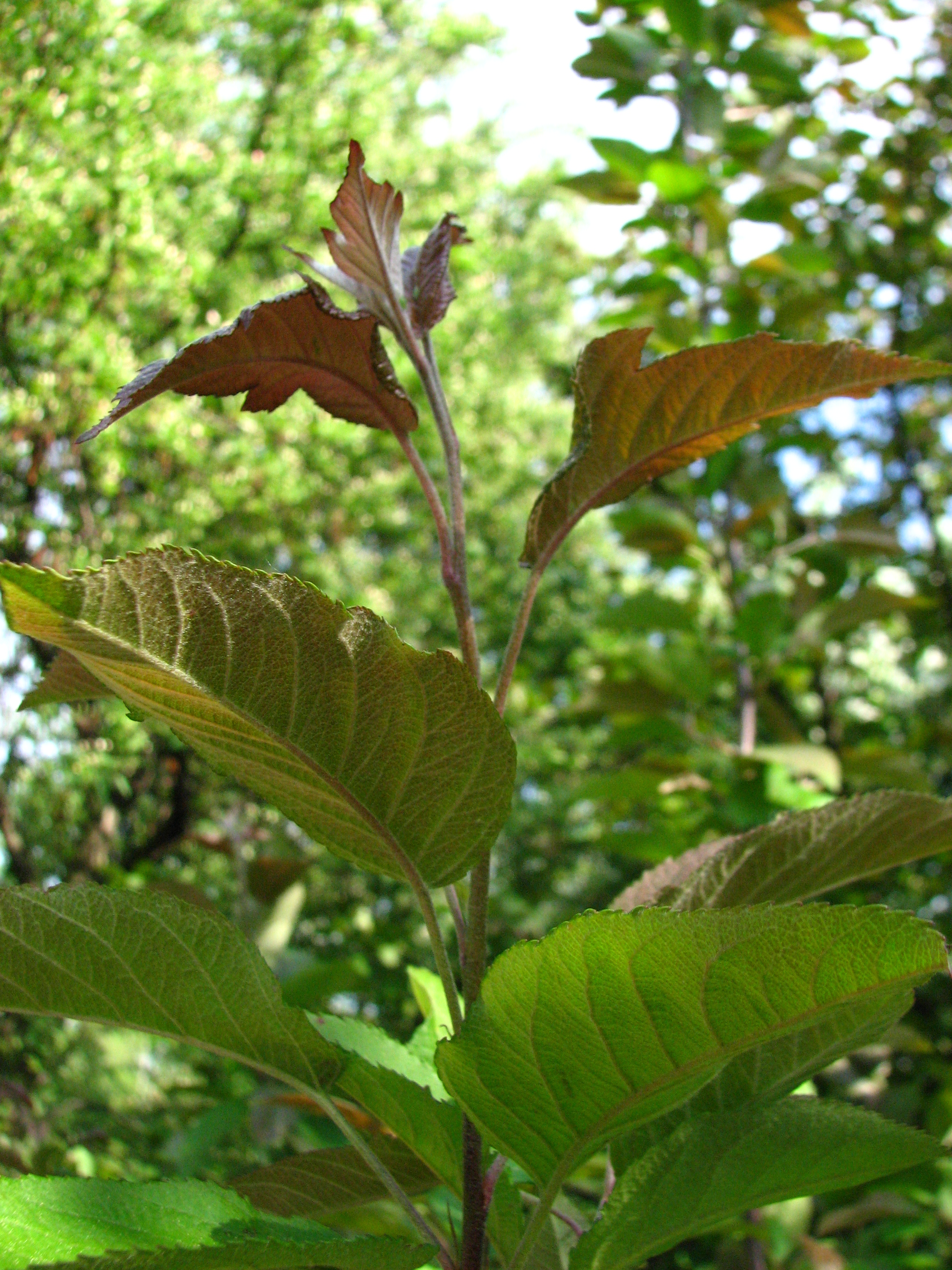
Leaf undersides

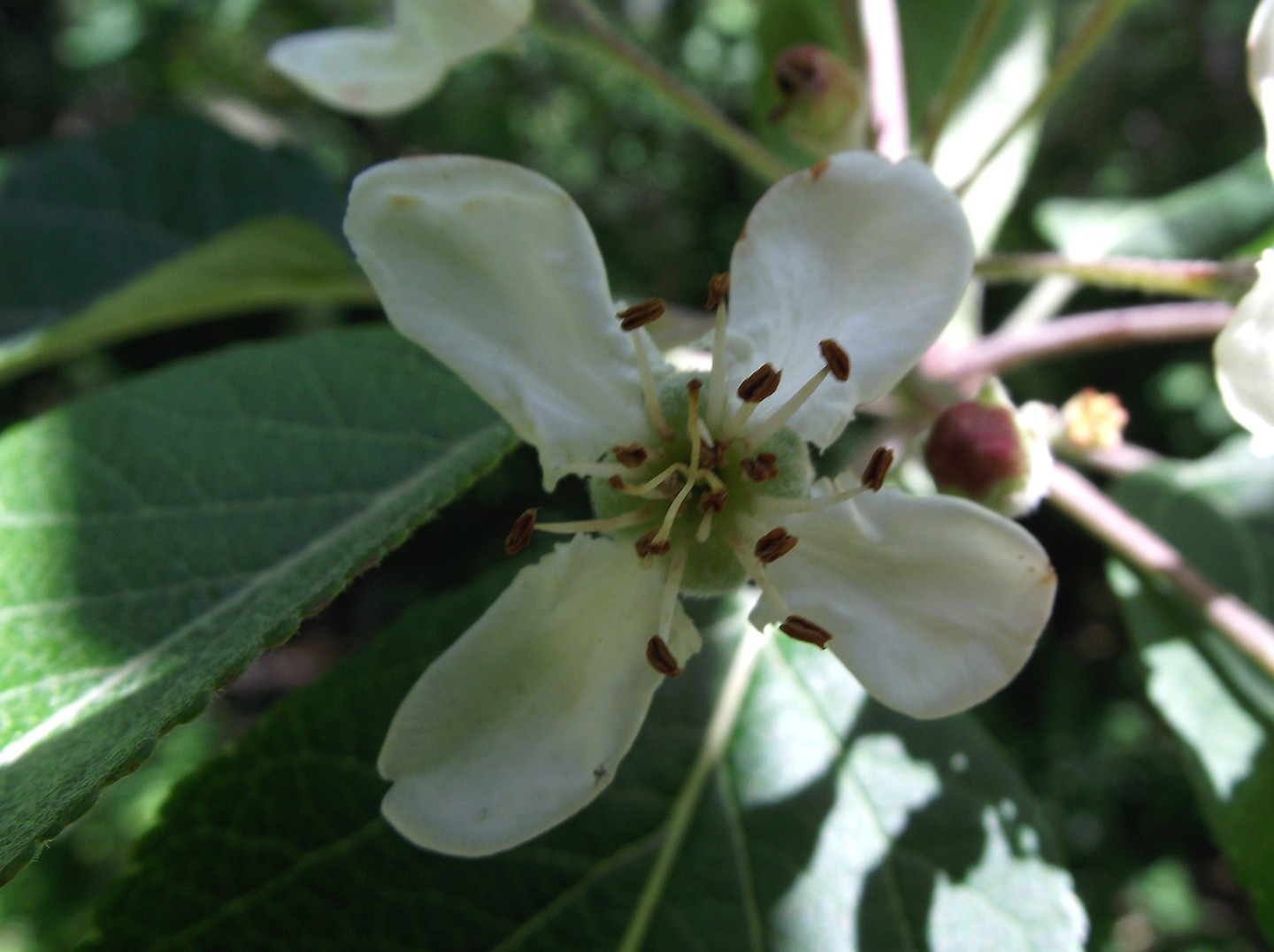
Close-up of flower

== Taxonomy ==
Archibald Menzies described the species in 1792 after finding it near today's Port Angeles, Washington.

== Distribution and habitat ==
The species can be found from Alaska, through British Columbia, to northwestern California. It grows in temperate coniferous forest, primarily in the Cascade Range and the Pacific Coast Ranges.

The tree can grow in a variety of maritime conditions, its rootstock tolerating wet soils (including saltwater estuaries), poorly drained areas and heavy clay soils. It can be found in high-rainfall regions.

== Ecology ==
It can be found growing along with red alder, bigleaf maple, willows, and cascara. Animals including grouse and bears eat the fruit.

== Uses ==
The oblong fruit can be eaten, but has a sour flavor. The fruit can also be used for extraction of pectin, useful in helping make jams and jellies from other fruits, and is also made into jams and jellies itself. The bark can be used as an herbal medicine. It is also grown in parks and gardens as an ornamental plant.

Pacific crabapple fruits were prized by indigenous peoples of the Pacific Northwest as a food source, and were gathered all along the coast. As a traditional medicinal plant, infusions of the bark and/or fruit were used, including for stomach disorders, skin and eye infections, and as an analgesic.

The tree was also valued for its tough, resilient wood, used for making implements, and for its bark, used for a wide range of medicinal purposes.
