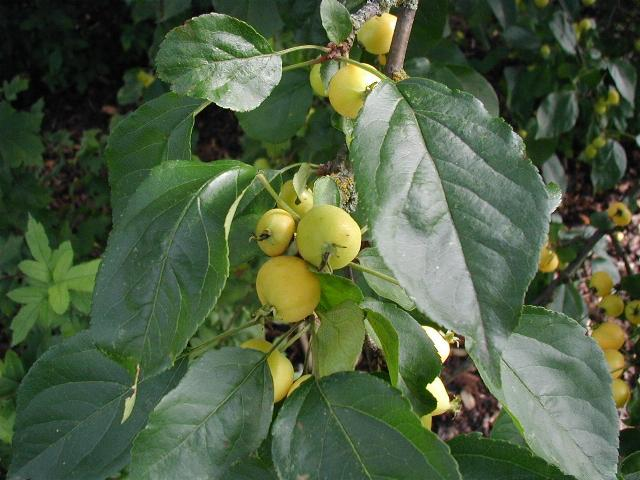

Conservation status
- Least Concern (IUCN 3.1)

Scientific classification
- Kingdom: Plantae
- Clade: Tracheophytes
- Clade: Angiosperms
- Clade: Eudicots
- Clade: Rosids
- Order: Rosales
- Family: Rosaceae
- Genus: Malus
- Species: M. baccata

Binomial name
- Malus baccata (L.) Borkh. 1803

Synonyms
- Malus baccata var. sibirica (Maxim.) C.K.Schneid.; Malus sibirica (Maxim.) Kom. & Aliss.; Malus sibirica Borkh.; Pyrus baccata L. 1767; Pyrus baccata var. sibirica Maxim.

= Malus baccata =

Asian species of apple

Malus baccata is an Asian species of apple known by the common names Siberian crab apple, Siberian crab, Manchurian crab apple and Chinese crab apple. It is native to many parts of Asia, but is also grown elsewhere as an ornamental tree and for rootstock. It is used for bonsai. It bears plentiful, fragrant, white flowers and edible red to yellow fruit of about 1 cm (3/8 in) diameter.

== Description ==
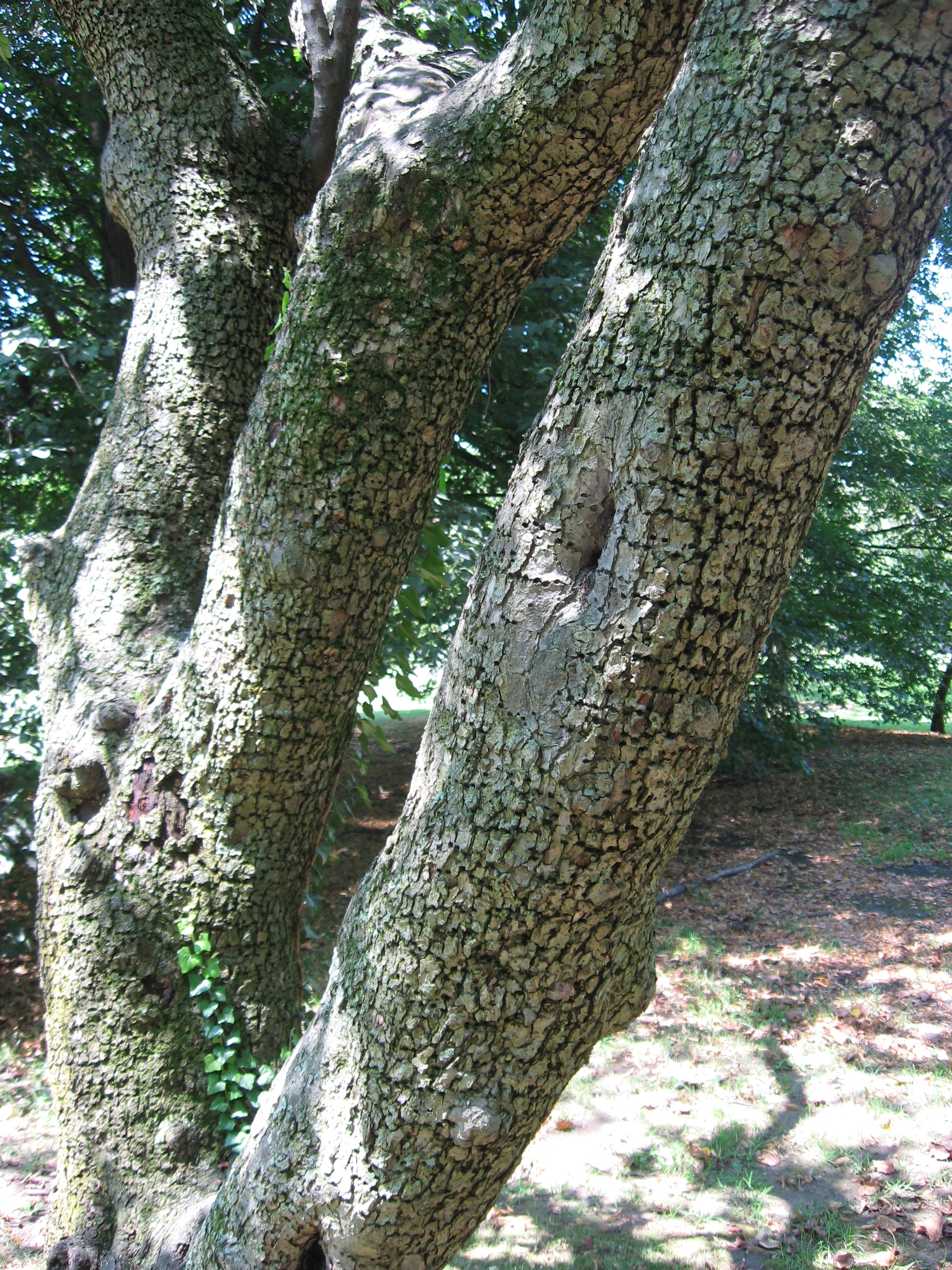
Trunk

The trees grow up to 10–14 m (33–46 ft) high. They have arching or overhanging red-brown branches and red-brown buds. The petioles are 2–5 cm (3/4–2 in) long, with few glands. Leaves are elliptical or egg-shaped, 3 cm–8 cm × 2 cm–3.5 cm (1 1/4 in–3 1/4 in × 3/4 in–1 1/2 in). The pedicels are slender and 1.5–4 cm (5/8–1 5/8 in) long. They bear white, fragrant flowers of 3–3.5 cm (1 1/8–1 3/8 in) in diameter in groups of four to six. Petals are white and egg-shaped, about 2.0–2.5 cm (3/4–1 in) long. Fruits are red to yellow and spherical, only about 1 cm (3/8 in) in diameter; they form dense clusters and resemble cherries from a distance. Flowering occurs in spring, with fruits appearing in September and October.

== Taxonomy ==
The subordinate taxa include these varieties:

- Malus baccata var. baccata (10–14 m or 33–46 ft tall) – China, Korea, Russia, Mongolia
- Malus baccata var. daochengensis
- Malus baccata var. gracilis (4–6 m or 13–20 ft) – Gansu and Shaanxi in China
- Malus baccata var. himalaica
- Malus baccata var. jinxianensis
- Malus baccata var. mandshurica (Manchurian crab apple, 5–10 m or 16–33 ft)
- Malus baccata var. xiaojinensis

== Distribution and habitat ==
The species is native to Russia, Mongolia, China, Korea, Bhutan, India, and Nepal, where it is common to mixed forests on hilly slopes at elevations up to 1,500 m (4,900 ft). The tree is found in Japan, and it has also been introduced to Europe and North America, where it is found in the wild mostly in the Great Lakes Region and in the Northeastern United States.

== Uses ==
The species is used as ornament for its flowers and fruit. The fruits are edible and are eaten fresh or dried. It is one of the tallest and most resistant to cold and pest species of its genus, thus is used for experimental breeding and grafting of other crab and domesticated apples. In particular, it is a common genetic source for M. pumila and M. asiatica in northern and northeastern China. M. b. var. mandshurica is used for bonsai.

== See also ==
- Applecrab
