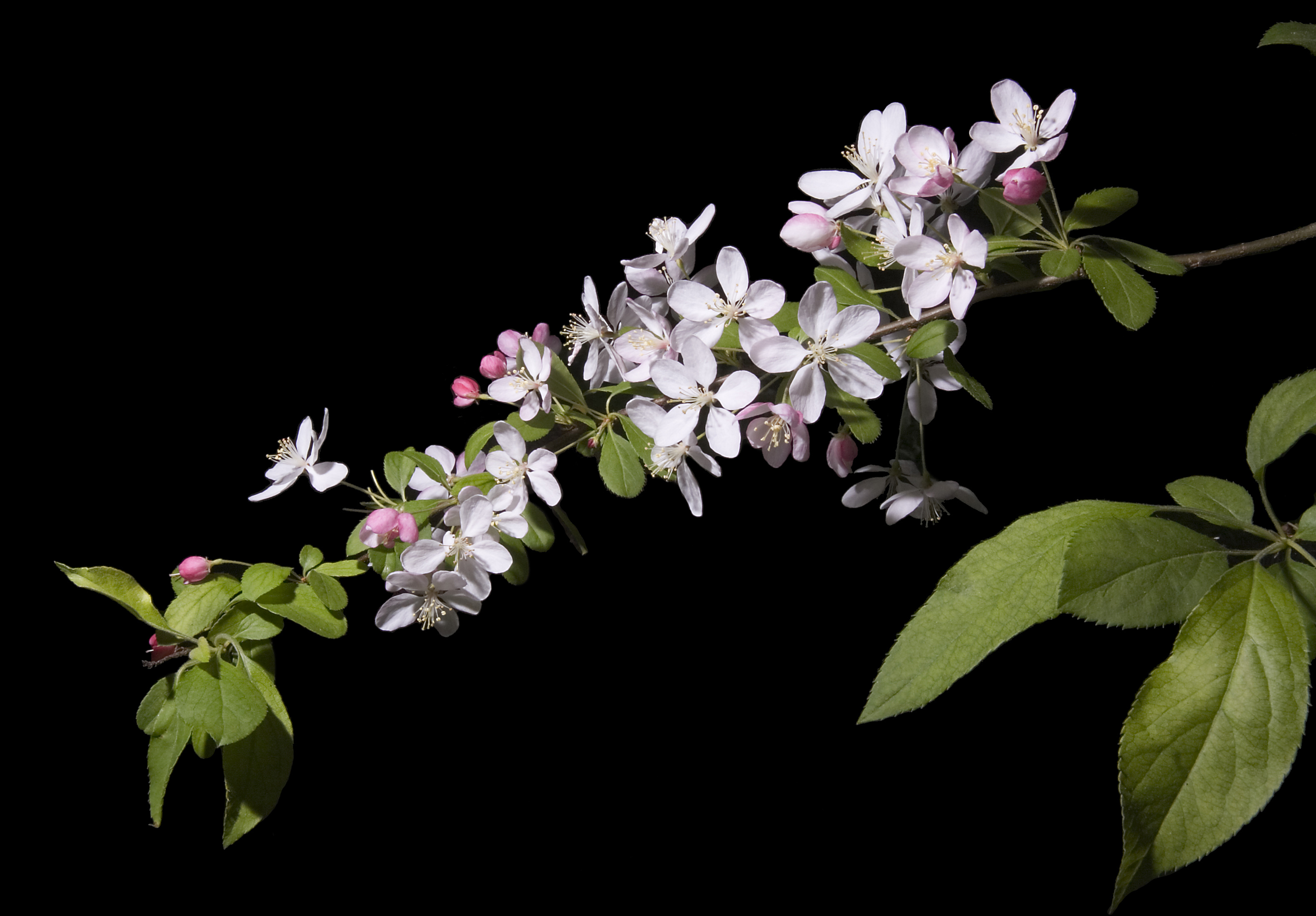
- Malus floribunda blossom

Scientific classification
- Kingdom: Plantae
- Clade: Embryophytes
- Clade: Tracheophytes
- Clade: Angiosperms
- Clade: Eudicots
- Clade: Rosids
- Order: Rosales
- Family: Rosaceae
- Genus: Malus
- Species: M. floribunda

Binomial name
- Malus floribunda Siebold ex Van Houtte

= Malus floribunda =

Species of flowering crabapple tree

Malus floribunda, common name Japanese flowering crabapple, Japanese crab, purple chokeberry, or showy crabapple, originates from Japan and East Asia. It may be a hybrid of M. toringo with M. baccata, in which case it would be written as Malus × floribunda.

== Description ==
Malus floribunda forms a round-headed, deciduous tree up to 12 m (39 ft) in height, with narrow leaves on arching branches. The flowers, appearing in spring, are white or pale pink, opening from crimson buds. The red or yellow fruit is about 1 cm (0.34 in) in diameter, ripening in autumn.

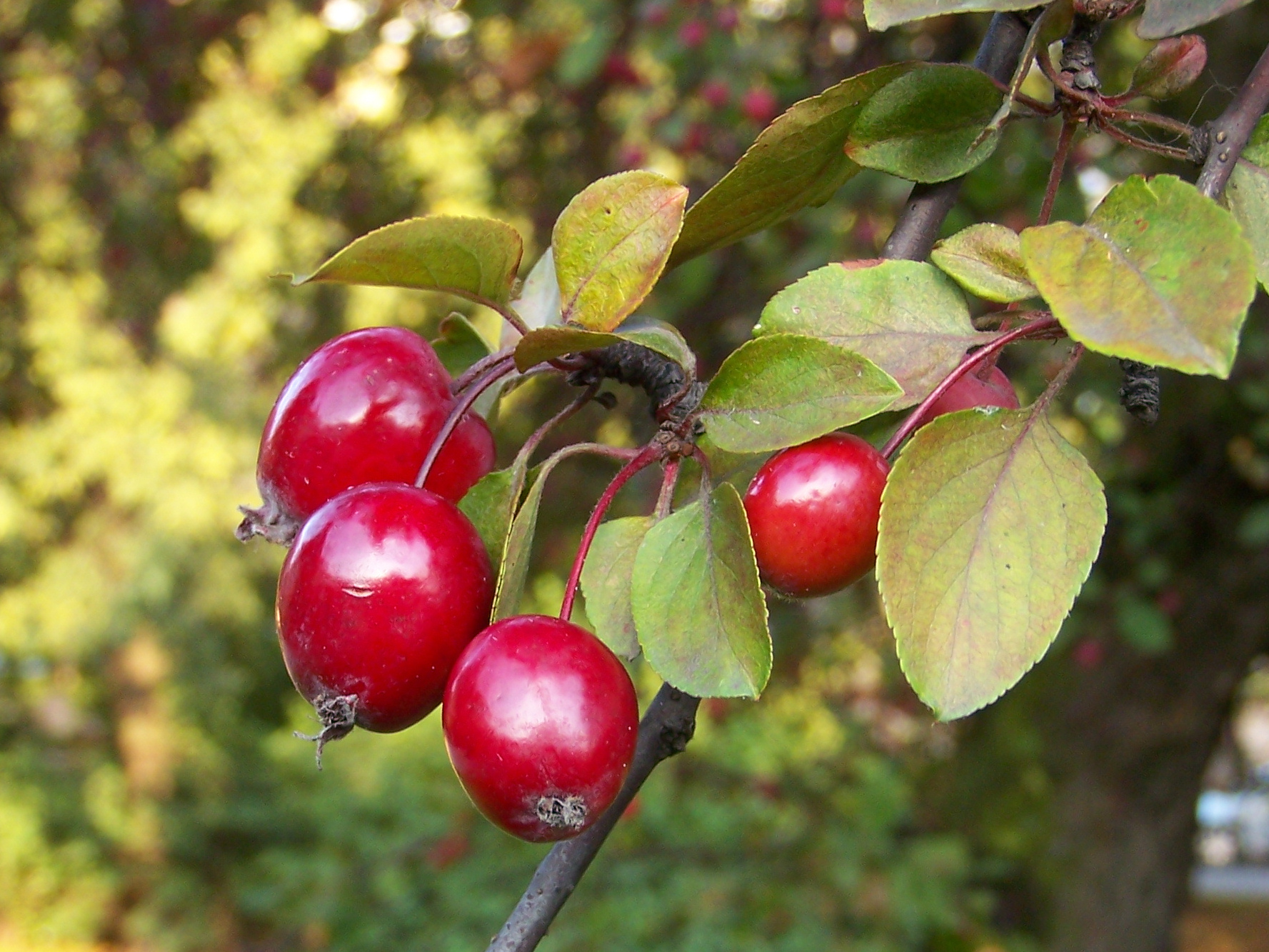
Red fruits

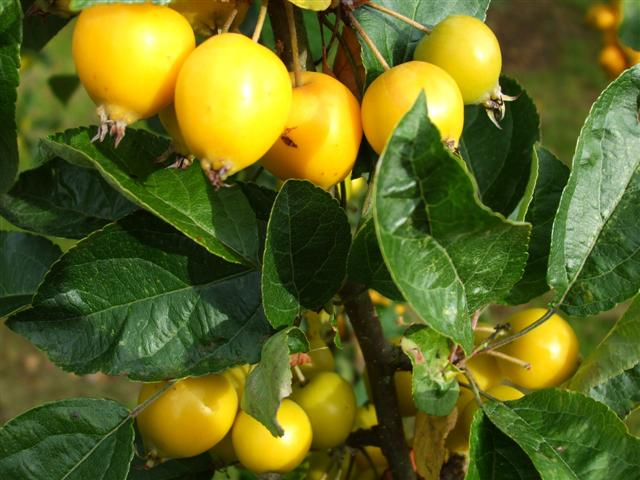
Yellow fruits

== Resistance ==
Malus floribunda has good disease resistance to apple scab and powdery mildew.

The initiators of the PRI disease resistant apple breeding program have discovered that Malus floribunda has resistance to the apple scab and founded the program to introduce this VF gene into cultivated apples. Their work had been progressing with great success.

== Awards ==
This crabapple species is considered one of the best crabapples for form and flower and has gained the Royal Horticultural Society's Award of Garden Merit.

== See also ==
- Applecrab
