= Apple scab =

Plant disease caused by fungus

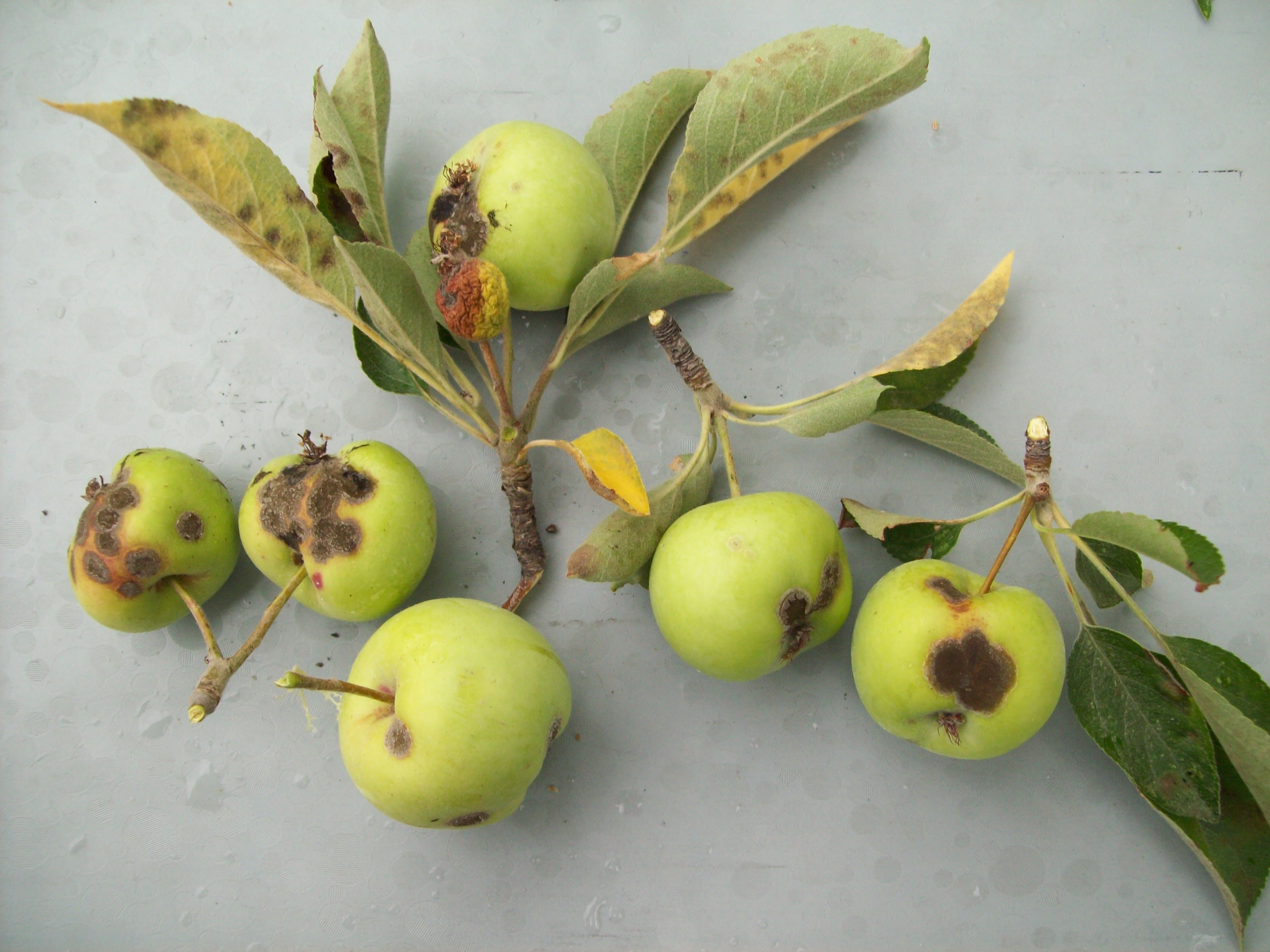
- The main symptom of apple scab in infected trees is the development of brown lesions on the foliage and fruits.
- Causal agents: Venturia inaequalis
- Hosts: Apple
- EPPO Code: VENTIN

Apple scab is a common disease of plants in the rose family (Rosaceae) that is caused by the ascomycete fungus Venturia inaequalis. While this disease affects several plant genera, including Sorbus, Cotoneaster, and Pyrus, it is most commonly associated with the infection of Malus trees, including species of flowering crabapple, as well as cultivated apple. The first symptoms of this disease are found in the foliage, blossoms, and developing fruits of affected trees, which develop dark, irregularly shaped lesions upon infection. Although apple scab rarely kills its host, infection typically leads to fruit deformation and premature leaf and fruit drop, which enhance the susceptibility of the host plant to abiotic stress and secondary infection. The reduction of fruit quality and yield may result in crop losses of up to 70%, posing a significant threat to the profitability of apple producers. To reduce scab-related yield losses, growers often combine preventive practices, including sanitation and resistance breeding, with reactive measures, such as targeted fungicide or biocontrol treatments, to prevent the incidence and spread of apple scab in their crops.

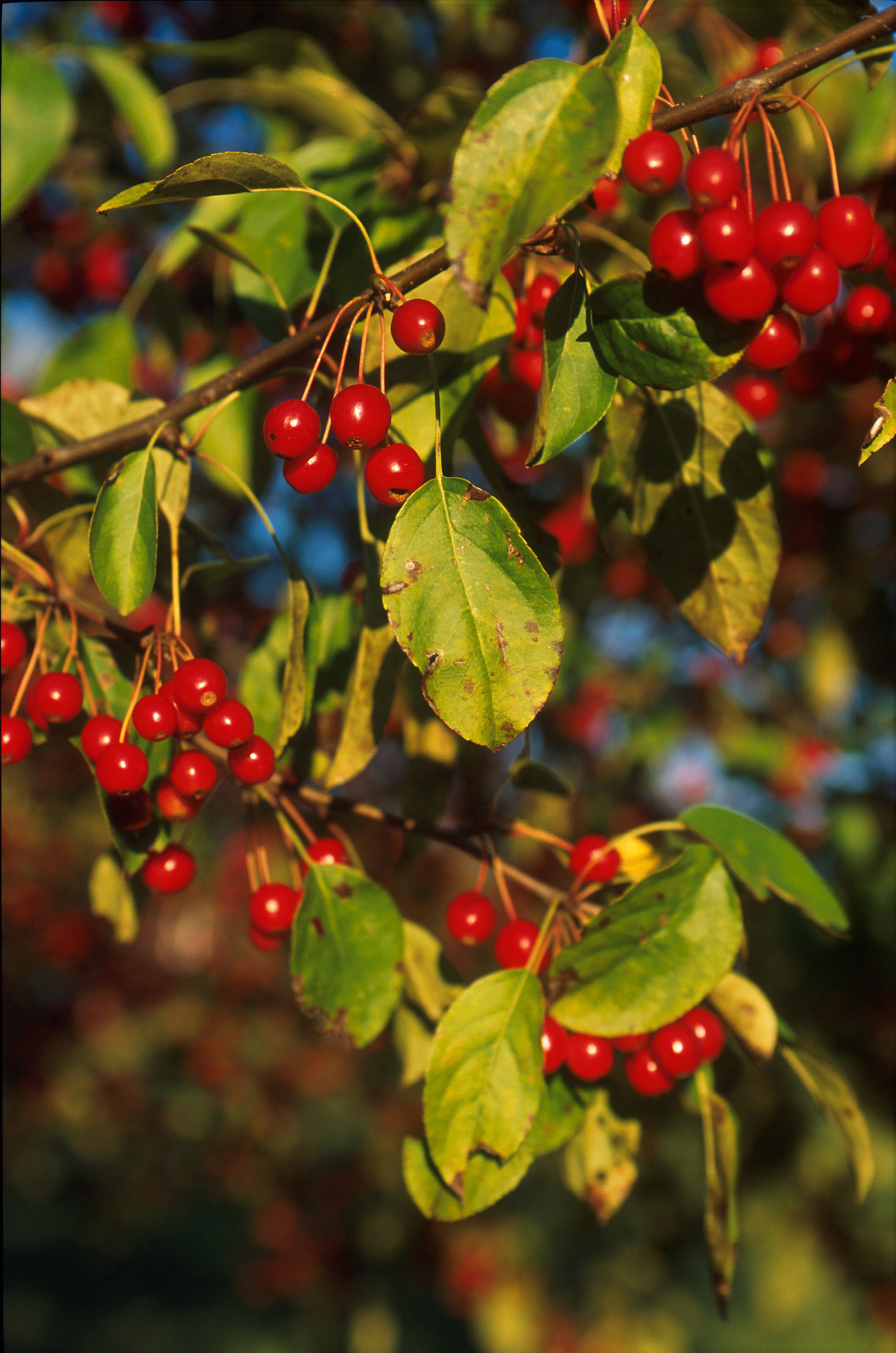
Apple scab on crabapple, lesions are visible on the leaves.

== History and distribution ==
The earliest official reports of apple scab were made in 1819 by Swedish botanist, Elias Fries. However, genetic studies have indicated that apple scab likely emerged in Central Asia. As neither the spores nor conidia of this disease are capable of travelling great distances, it is likely that apple scab spread through the movement of domesticated apple trees by migrating humans. By the end of the 19th century, the disease had spread to North America and Oceania alongside the importation of host plants. Today apple scab is present in nearly all regions where apples are cultivated, with the most significant infections occurring in temperate areas, where it is cool and moist in the spring.

== Disease cycle ==
The disease cycle begins in early spring, when cool temperatures and abundant moisture promote the release of sexual spores (ascospores) from overwintering structures (pseudothecia) found in the debris at the base of previously infected trees. Moisture is a critical factor in the development of the disease as rainfall not only triggers the release of ascospores, but also facilitates the infection of new hosts by helping the spores adhere to and germinate on the healthy tissue of new hosts. Following their dissemination, ascospores are transported to the surfaces of newly emerged leaves and blossoms by wind and splashing water. The tissue is then penetrated either directly with a germ tube or indirectly using an appressorium, thus initiating a new infection. Shortly after penetration, light-green, irregularly shaped lesions develop on infected foliar tissue and gradually darken, expand, and pucker as the infection progresses. Lesions on fruit are black or brown and irregularly shaped, with older fruit lesions causing the underlying tissue to become dry, corky, and eventually disfigured by splitting. Within 10 days of infection, asexual conidia will develop on the darkened lesions and allow for the establishment of secondary infections in healthy leaf and fruit tissue. Under optimal conditions, this cycle may repeat every 1–2 weeks during the growing season. At the end of the season, heavily infected fruit and foliage fall from the canopy, allowing for the development of pseudothecia, which serve as a source of primary inoculum for the next spring.

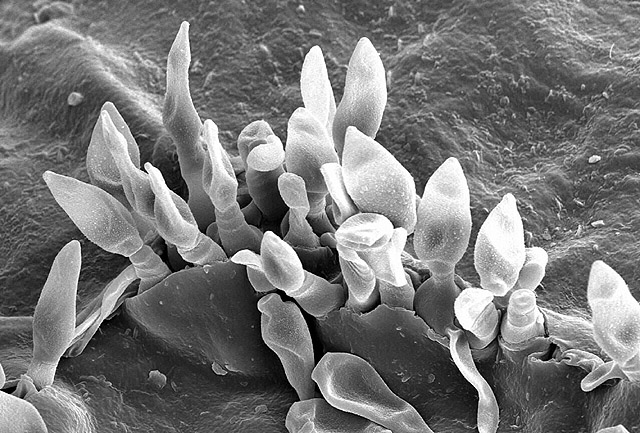
The reproductive conidia of Venturia inaequalis erupting through the cuticle of a crabapple leaf.

== Predicting infection ==
First developed in 1944 by American plant pathologist, W.D. Mills, a Mills Table predicts the likelihood of an apple scab infection developing based on the average temperature and the number of hours of leaf wetness that the host plant is exposed to. This prediction system has been rapidly adopted in both Europe and North America, where apple growers use it as an early warning system for new infections, allowing them to apply preventive fungicides when appropriate. Several revisions have been made to the Mills Table since its creation. The most notable revision was made in 1989 by plant pathologists William MacHardy and David Gadoury, who determined that ascospores required 3 hours less than originally calculated in order to establish a new infection. While other methods of prediction include ascospore maturation models and leaf orchard leaf canopy models, the Mills Table, combined with electronic weather monitoring, remains the most-widely used tool for predicting apple scab infection periods.

== Management of apple scab ==
=== Cultural controls ===
Cultural controls may be used as a first step when seeking to reduce the incidence of new infections. These practices include cleaning leaf litter from the base of previously infected trees, as well as removing infected woody material from the canopy when performing annual pruning. Doing so will reduce the amount of primary inoculum in the spring and subsequently delay the establishment of the disease. Furthermore, regular pruning will improve air flow and light penetration in the canopy, which ultimately inhibits the development and spread of disease. Another aspect of cultural control is water management. As water triggers ascospore release and promotes germination on vulnerable tissue, growers are advised to monitor watering periods and avoid using overhead watering systems. Doing so may ultimately aid in reducing infection periods caused by natural precipitation.

=== Chemical controls ===
The management of apple scab using chemical controls is primarily concerned with preventing the initiation of primary infection cycles by reducing the germination of ascospores. As such, fungicides are typically applied early in the season, when ascospores are first released. However, fungicide applications may also be made later in the season to prevent infection of old leaves, which can help reduce the amount of primary inoculum for the following season. Benzimidazole fungicides are among the most commonly used classes of fungicide for managing apple scab in conventional orchards; however, there is some evidence that the disease is developing resistance to this class of fungicides, along with several others, including demethylation inhibitors and quinone outside inhibitors. To manage the development of fungicide resistance, growers can reduce the number of applications made throughout the season and alternate between different classes of fungicide.

In organic production systems, growers commonly use copper- or sulfur-based protectant sprays to reduce the efficacy of primary inoculum. Although these sprays were among the earliest methods of preventing the development of apple scab, they do little to manage pre-existing infections and application may significantly damage the foliage of treated trees. Moreover, research has indicated that applications of copper-based fungicides may result in changes in the structure and functionality of soil microbiota, thus having a negative effect on soil health. As such, alternative management strategies appropriate for organic production systems are currently being developed.

=== Biological control ===
Biological control refers to the use of a population of one organism (a biological control agent) to suppress the population of another. There are very few biological control agents registered for the control of apple scab. One of the most widely recognized products is Serenade® ASO, a microbial biofungicide which uses Bacillus subtilis as its active ingredient and may be used to control foliar diseases caused by bacteria or fungi. Furthermore, several fungal antagonists have been isolated and identified as potential biocontrols. One of such antagonists is Cladosporium cladosporioides (strain H39). This antagonistic fungus has demonstrated significant bioactivity against apple scab. This was indicated in a 2015 study, which found that applications of C. cladosporioides could reduce leaf scab incidence by 42–98% and apple scab incidence by 41–94% in both conventionally and organically managed orchards.

== Resistance breeding programs ==
The first formal resistance breeding programs for apple scab began in the early 20th century with the development of the PRI Apple Breeding Program by Purdue University, Rutgers University, and the University of Illinois. Since its inception in 1945, the PRI Apple Breeding Program has used controlled crosses between cultivated apples and wild Malus species to develop 1500 resistant cultivars, 16 of which (including 'Prima,' 'Jonafree,' and 'Goldrush') have been named released into market. Modern genetic work has found that a total of fifteen genes may confer resistance to apple scab. Many of these genes have been isolated from wild Malus spp. populations in East Asia, where a high level of species diversity still remains. Of these resistance genes, the Vf (Rvi6) gene is the most well-studied and is currently being used by researchers seeking to develop resistant cultivars using transgenic technology. Another resistance gene is Va from Antonovka. While the development of transgenic resistant cultivars may reduce management costs in orchards, limited market acceptance pose a barrier to early adoption by commercial growers. Moreover, researchers have observed a breakdown of resistance genes by Venturia populations, posing another significant barrier to the success of this technology.

== See also ==
- Venturia inaequalis
