= Apple pie =

Dessert pie made with apples

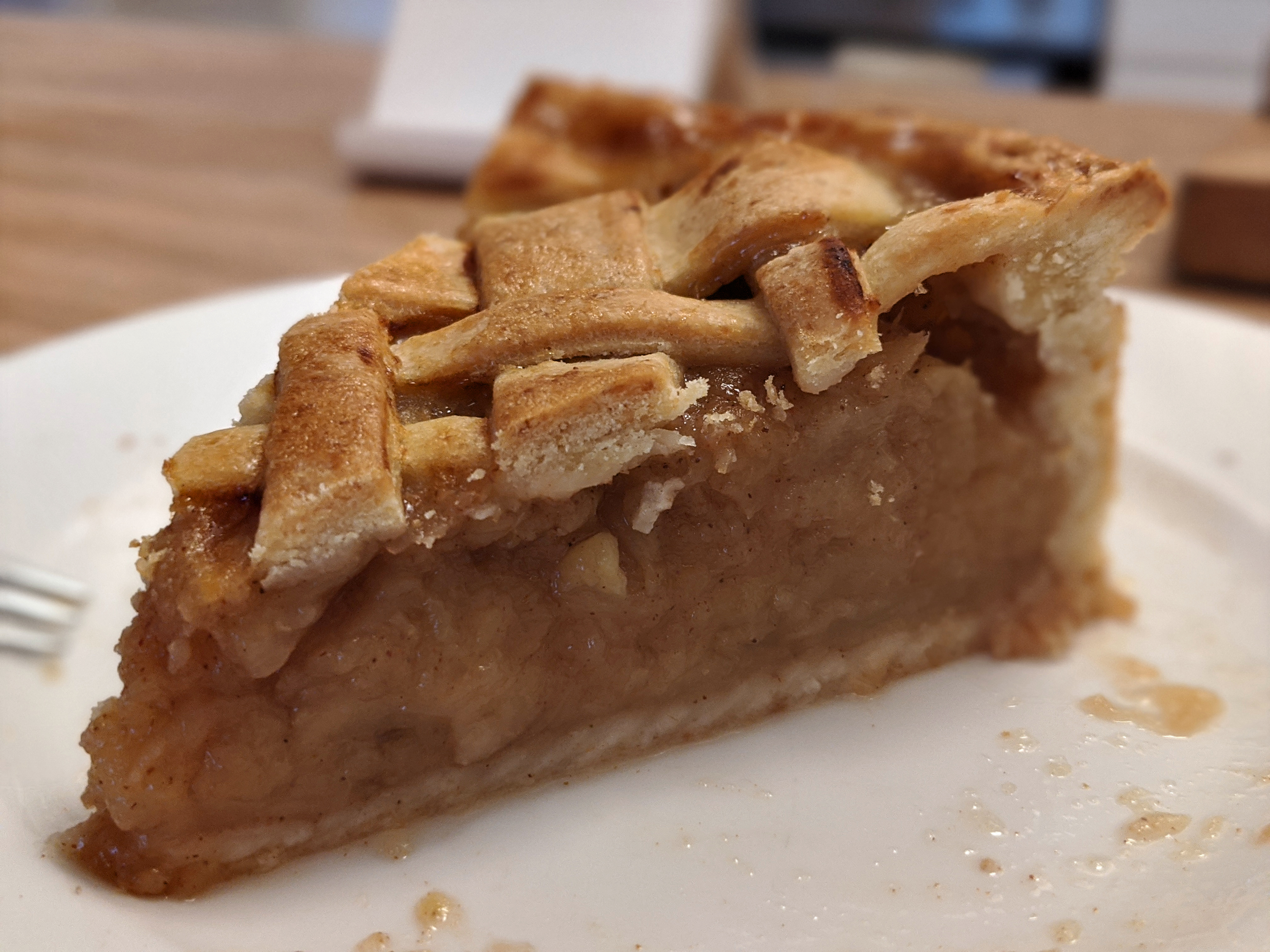
- Apple pie with a lattice
- Place of origin: England
- Serving temperature: Hot or cold
- Main ingredients: Apples, flour, sugar, milk, cinnamon, butter, salt

An apple pie is a fruit pie in which the principal filling is apples. It generally has shortcrust pastry both above and below the filling; the upper pastry may be solid or latticed (woven of crosswise strips). The bottom pastry base may be baked separately (known as "blind-baking") to prevent it from getting soggy. Tarte Tatin is baked with the pastry on top, but this is served the opposite way round with the fruit exposed.

First recorded in the 14th century in England, apple pie recipes are now a standard part of cuisines in many countries where apples grow. Apple pie is a significant dessert in many countries of Europe, Canada, Australia, New Zealand, and the United States. Due to a greater use of sugar in the recipe, American apple pies may be sweeter than European versions.

== Ingredients ==
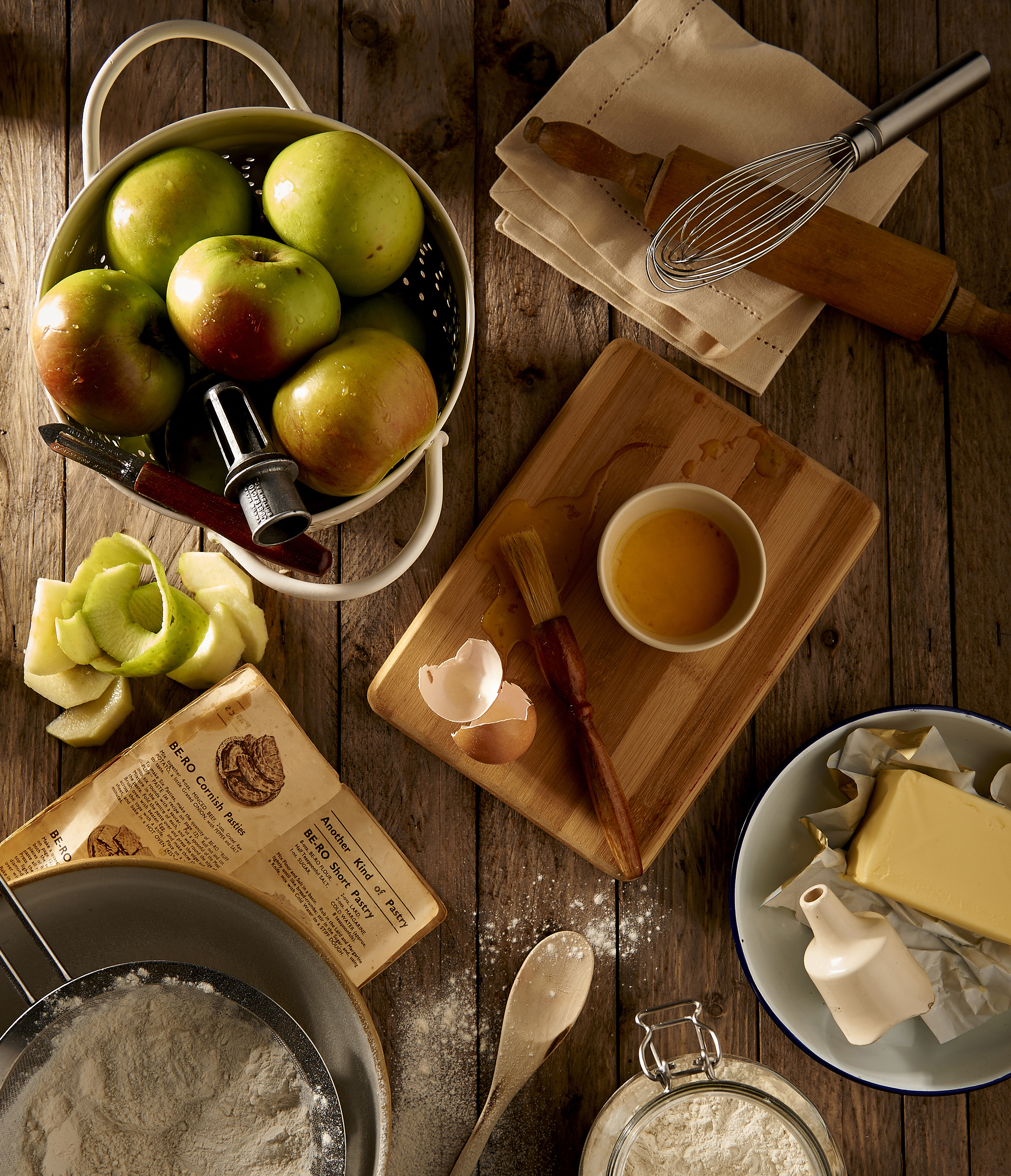
Ingredients of an apple pie

Commonly used cooking apple varieties for baking pie include the Braeburn, Bramley apple, Cox's, Cripps Pink (or Pink Lady), Ginger Gold, Golden Delicious, Granny Smith, Idared, Jonathan, Rome Beauty, Winesap, and York. The fruit for the pie can be fresh, canned, or reconstituted from dried apples in the case of dried apple pie. Dried or preserved apples were originally substituted only at times when fresh fruit was unavailable. The basic ingredients of the filling are sugar, and an acidic ingredient like lemon juice. A thickener like eggs or corn starch may be added, while butter is added in the US. Spices may be added like cinnamon or nutmeg. Lemon juice which is used to prevent oxidation of the apples when macerating the filling. Many older recipes call for honey in place of the then-expensive sugar.

Most apple pies use shortcrust pastry. However, the tarte Tatin is traditionally made with puff pastry, while the Greek milopita bougatsa uses filo pastry.

== Pies around the world ==
=== Canada ===
With apples harvested as early as the 17th century in what is now Quebec and Nova Scotia, a Canadian apple pie recipe with Limberger cheese was recorded in 1920, and a 1934 cookbook described use of Canadian-grown sour apples. Canadian apple pies include mumble crumble, Dutch apple, and an apple maple pie featuring maple syrup.

=== England ===
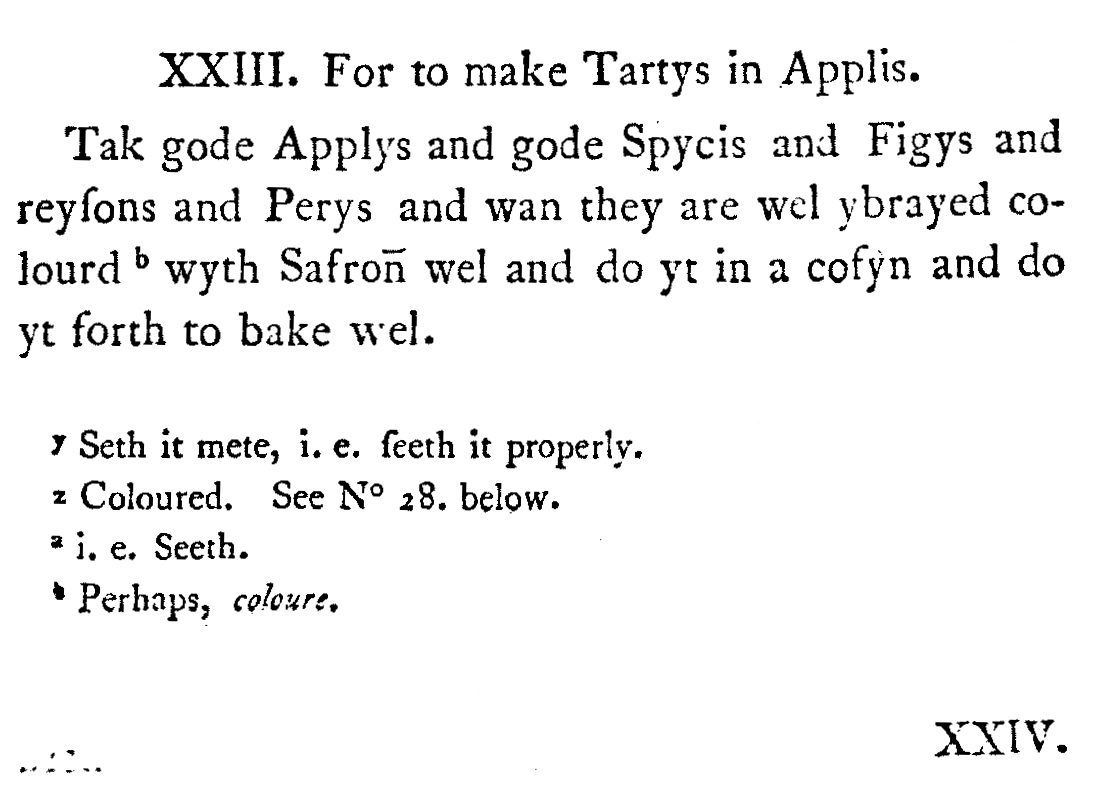
14th-century recipe

The 14th century recipe collection the Forme of Cury gives a recipe including good apples, good spices, figs, raisins and pears in a cofyn, a casing of pastry. Saffron colours the filling.

Lattice pastry styles were found from the 17th century alongside the more traditional dome shaped pie crust. Traditionally, apples were stewed before the pie was baked, but some modern English versions incorporate thick layers of sweetened slices of, usually, Bramley apple; layered into a dome shape to allow for downward shrinkage, and thus avoid a saggy middle; then topped with butter or lard shortcrust pastry; and baked until the apple filling is cooked. In Yorkshire, Wilfa apple cake is served on St Wilfa's day, and although called a cake, it is made with shortcrust pastry topped with Wensleydale cheese.

In English-speaking countries, apple pie, often considered a comfort food, is eaten hot or cold, on its own or with cream, custard or ice cream. Apple pies are often sold in supermarkets and convenience stores as mini versions in multipacks.

=== France ===
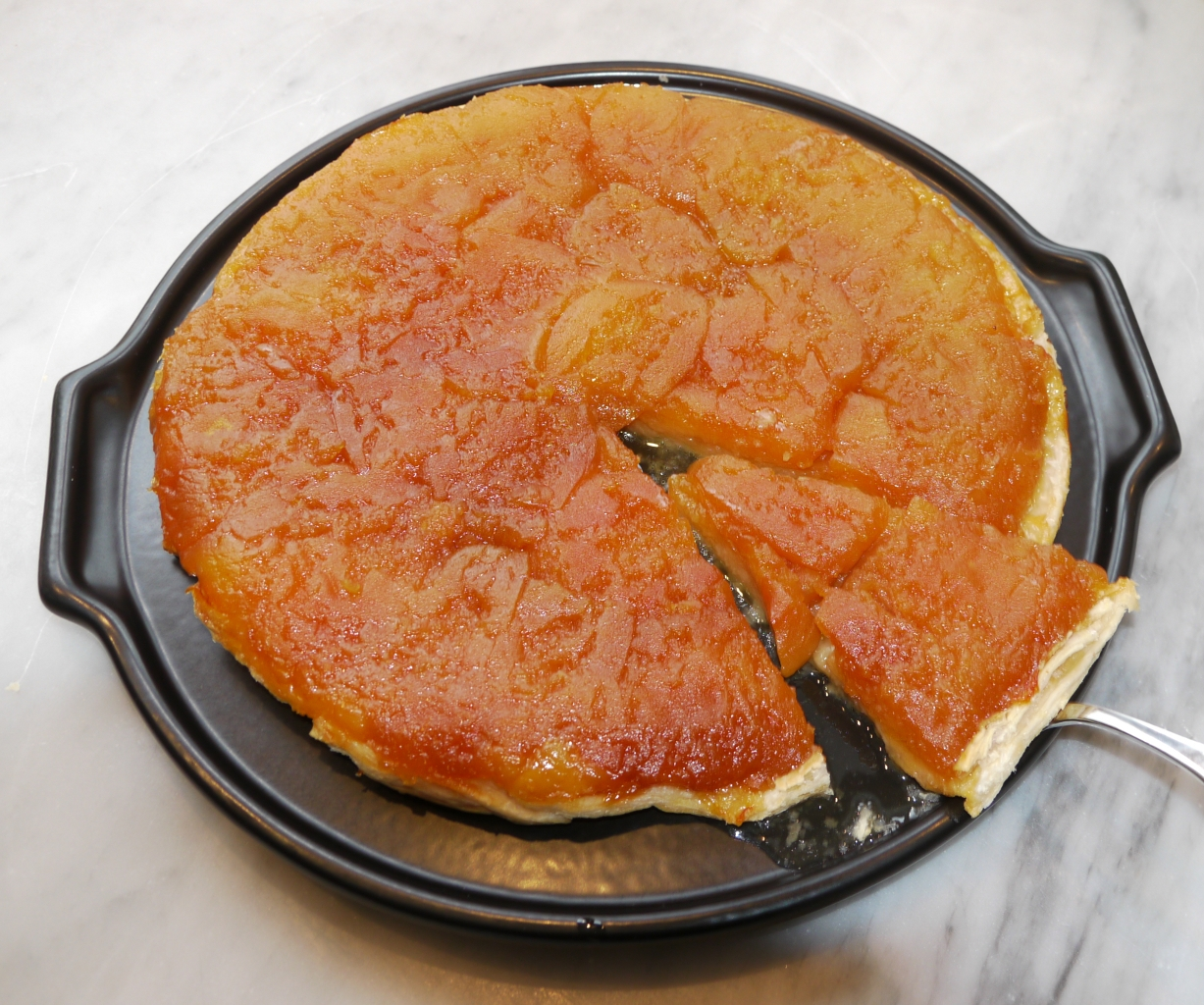
tarte Tatin, a French variation on apple pie

France has several types of apple pies. Tarte aux pommes and tarte Tatin are both made with puff pastry. The tarte Tatin is a tart in which the apples are caramelized in butter and sugar before the tart is baked. The tarte is then served with the pastry served on the bottom exposing the caramelised apple. Other variants include the Normandy tart, and Croustade.

=== Germany ===
In Germany, the word Kuchen encompasses desserts that English speakers may call "pie", with apple pie coming under Apfelkuchen. The traditional pastry based apple pie is known as Gedeckter Apfelkuchen and is fully encased in pastry with the apples cooked in the oven.

=== Italy ===
In Italy, the national apple pie dishes are known as crostata di mele, which has a shortcrust pastry base with a layer of either apple jam or apple slices, which is either left open or is covered with a pastry lattice, and torta di mele, which is closer to an apple cake. Local specialities include sfogliata di mele teramana, from the city of Teramo in Abruzzo, which is a layer of puff pastry layered with slices of apple.

=== Netherlands ===
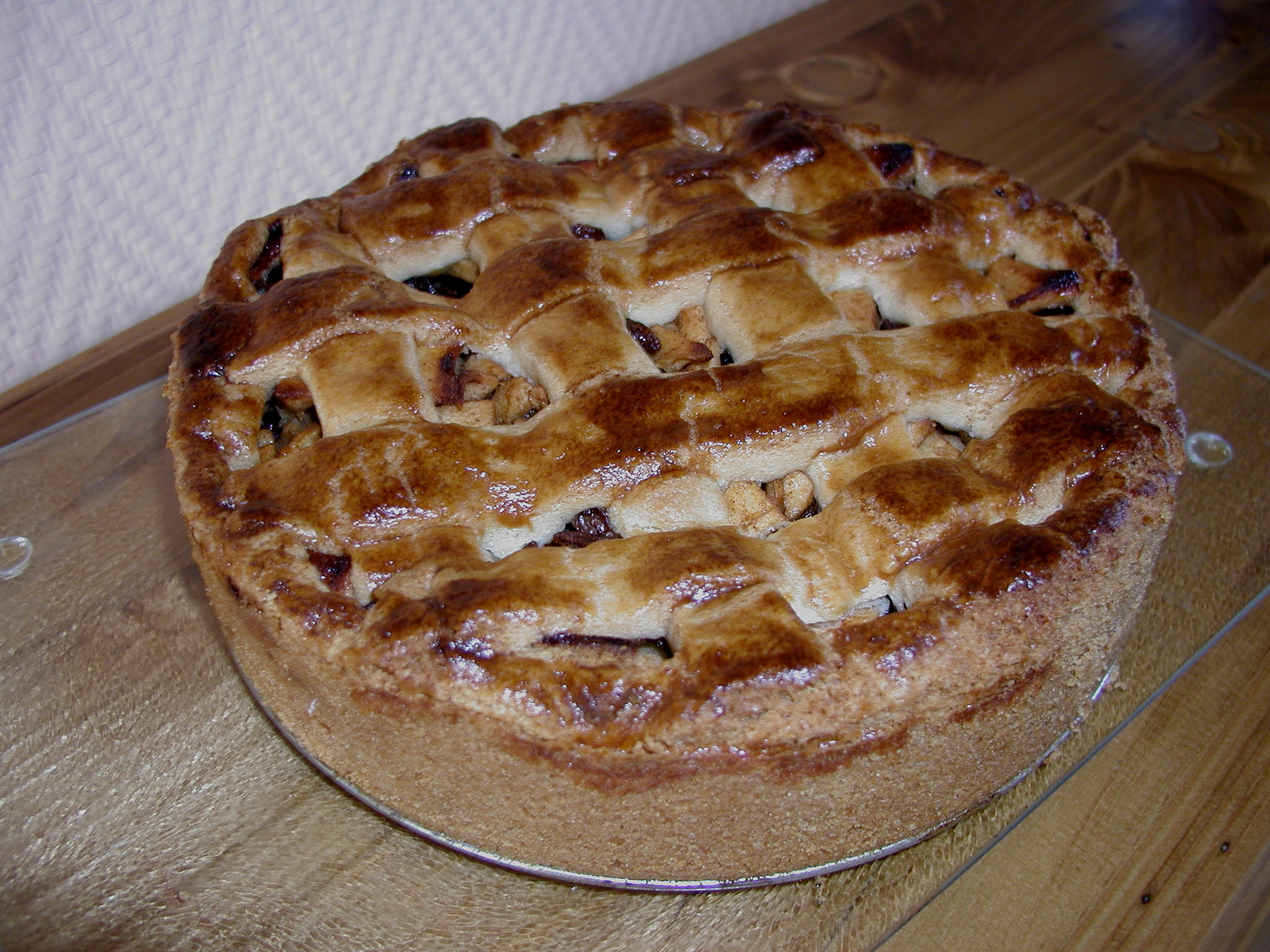
Dutch apple pie with a lattice top layer (appeltaart)

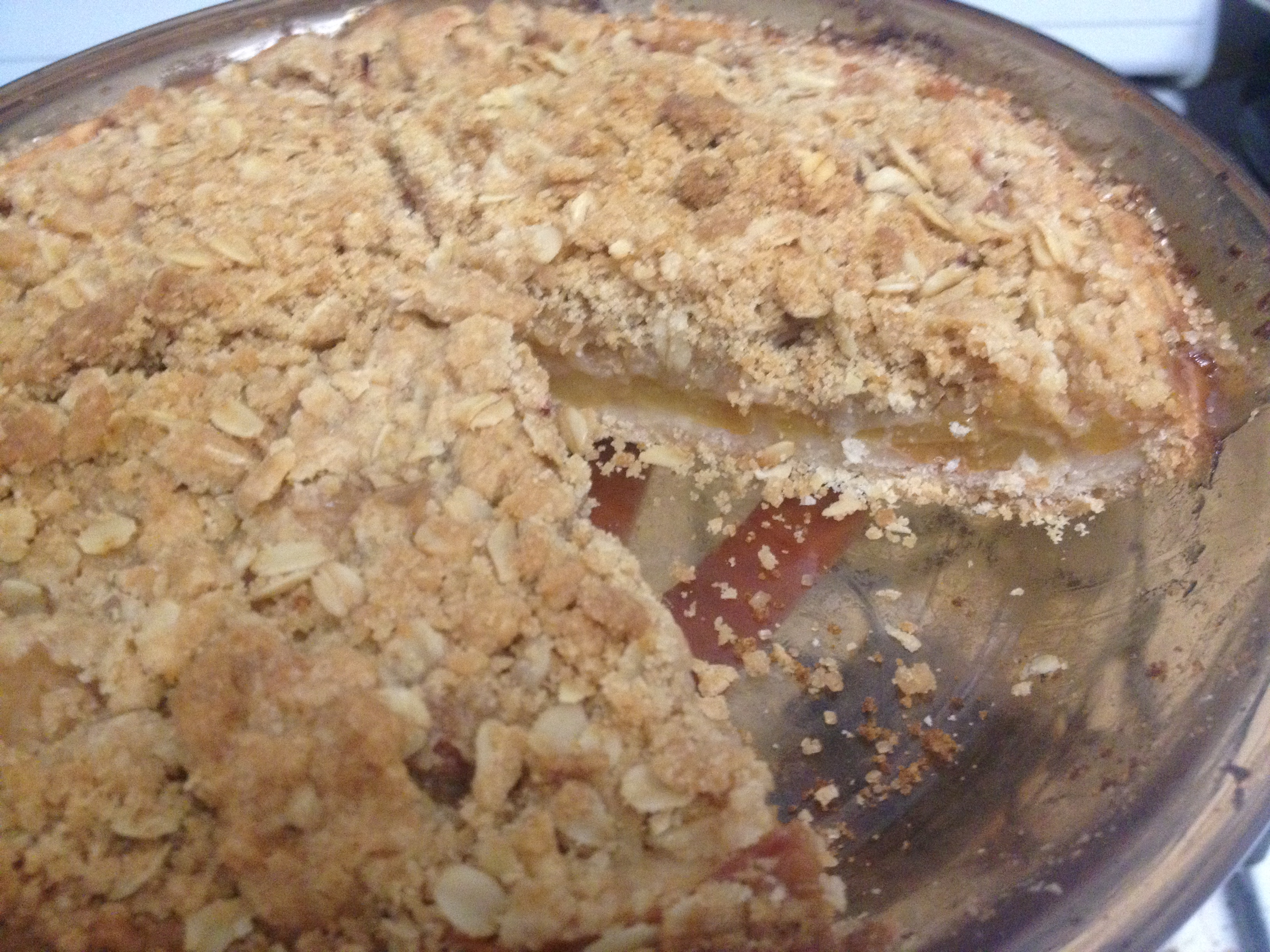
Dutch apple crumble pie (appelkruimeltaart)

Recipes for Dutch apple pie go back to the Middle Ages. An early Dutch language cookbook from 1514, Een notabel boecxken van cokeryen ("A notable little cookery book"), letterpress printed in Brussels by Thomas van der Noot, who may also have been the author, documents a recipe for Appeltaerten (modern Dutch Appeltaarten 'apple pies'). This early recipe was simple, requiring only shortcrust pastry, slices of especially soft apples with their skin and seeds removed, and den selven deeghe daer die taerte af ghemaect es (more of the same dough) on top. It was then baked in a typical Dutch oven. Once baked, the top crust (except at the edges) would be cut out from the middle, after which the apple slices were potentially put through a sieve before the pie was stirred with a wooden spoon. At this point the book recommends adding several spices to the pie, namely: cardamom, ginger, cinnamon, nutmeg, clove, mace and powdered sugar. Finally, after mixing the ingredients into the pie with cream, it is once again put into the oven to dry.

Traditional Dutch apple pie comes in two varieties, a crumb or streusel-top (appelkruimeltaart) and a lattice-top (appeltaart) style pie. Both recipes are distinct in that they typically call for flavourings of cinnamon and lemon juice to be added and differ in texture, not taste. Dutch apple pies may include ingredients such as full-cream butter, raisins and almond paste, in addition to ingredients such as apples and sugar, which they have in common with other recipes. Both modern types have a shortcrust pastry on the bottom and around the edges. The apples are usually a crisp and mildly tart variety such as Goudreinet or Elstar. It can be eaten warm or cold, sometimes with a dash of whipped cream or vanilla ice cream.

=== Poland ===
In Poland, szarlotka is regarded as apple pie. It has a shortcrust base, a filling of spiced shredded apple, and is either topped with more shortcrust pastry or a crumble mixture. There is a similar dish called jabłecznik, but this is considered a cake as it is not made with shortcrust pastry.

=== Sweden ===
The Swedish style apple pie, äppelpaj is predominantly a variety of apple crumble, rather than a traditional pastry pie. Often, breadcrumbs are used (wholly or partially) instead of flour, and sometimes rolled oats. It is usually flavoured with cinnamon and served with vanilla custard or ice cream.

=== Spain ===
In Spain, there are two types of apple pie. Tarta de manzana is a dish that either resembles a pie made with pastry, or as a cake made with a batter. Empanadillas de manzana con canela are a turnover version of an apple pie.

=== United States ===
Apple pie was brought to the colonies by the English, the Dutch, and the Swedes during the 17th and 18th centuries. Two recipes for apple pie appear in America's first cookbook, American Cookery by Amelia Simmons, which was published in 1796.

The apple pie had to wait for the planting of European varieties, brought across the Atlantic, to become fruit-bearing apple trees, to be selected for their cooking qualities as there were no native apples except crabapples, which yield very small and sour fruit. In the meantime, the colonists were more likely to make their pies, or "pasties", from meat, rather than fruit; and the main use for apples, once they were available, was in cider. However, there are American apple pie recipes, both manuscript and printed, from the 18th century. Apple varieties are usually propagated by grafting, as clones, but in the New World, planting from seeds was more successful, leading to development of hundreds of new native varieties.

Apple pie was a common food in 18th-century Delaware. As noted by the New Sweden historian Dr. Israel Acrelius in a letter: "Apple pie is used throughout the whole year, and when fresh Apples are no longer to be had, dried ones are used. It is the evening meal of children."

The mock apple pie, made from crackers, was probably invented for use aboard ships, as it was known to the British Royal Navy as early as 1812. The earliest known published recipes for mock apple pie date from the antebellum period of the 1850s. In the 1930s, and for many years afterwards, Ritz Crackers promoted a recipe for mock apple pie using its product, along with sugar and various spices. In the US, "Dutch apple pie" refers specifically to crumb-top variety known as appelkruimeltaart in the Netherlands. Dried apple pie is prominent in the cuisine of the Pennsylvania Dutch, where it is known as schnitz pie.

==== In American culture ====
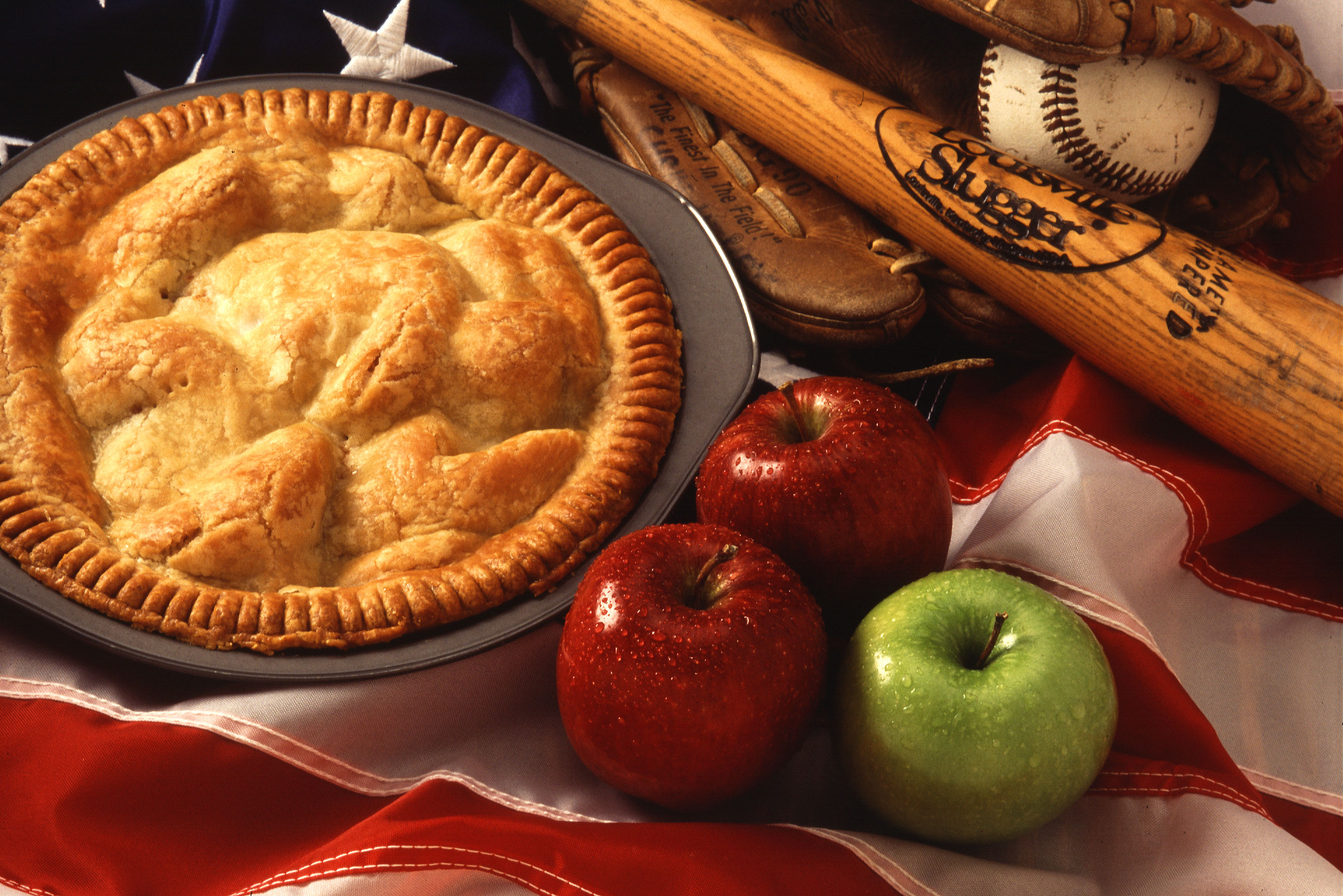
Apple pie is one of the cultural icons of the United States.

Apple pie was one of the dishes that Rhode Island army officers ate for their Fourth of July celebrations during the Siege of Petersburg, part of the American Civil War. Although apple pie originated in England and has been eaten in Europe since long before the European colonisation of the Americas, the phrase "as American as apple pie" describes something as being typical or normal in American culture, such as blue jeans, baseball, or rock-and-roll music.

In the 19th and 20th centuries, apple pie became a symbol of American prosperity and national pride. A newspaper article published in 1902 declared that "No pie-eating people can be permanently vanquished." "Mom and apple pie" became a shorthand for Americana. American soldiers during both world wars of the twentieth century loved eating apple pie. During the First Cold War, Jack Holden and Frances Kay wrote their patriotic song "The Fiery Bear" (1950), using apple pie and baseball as American cultural icons, creating a contrast with the Russian bear of the Soviet Union. "American Pie" is a 1971 hit song by Don McLean that makes multiple references to American popular culture, including apple pie. Advertisers cemented the status of apple pie in American culture that same decade.

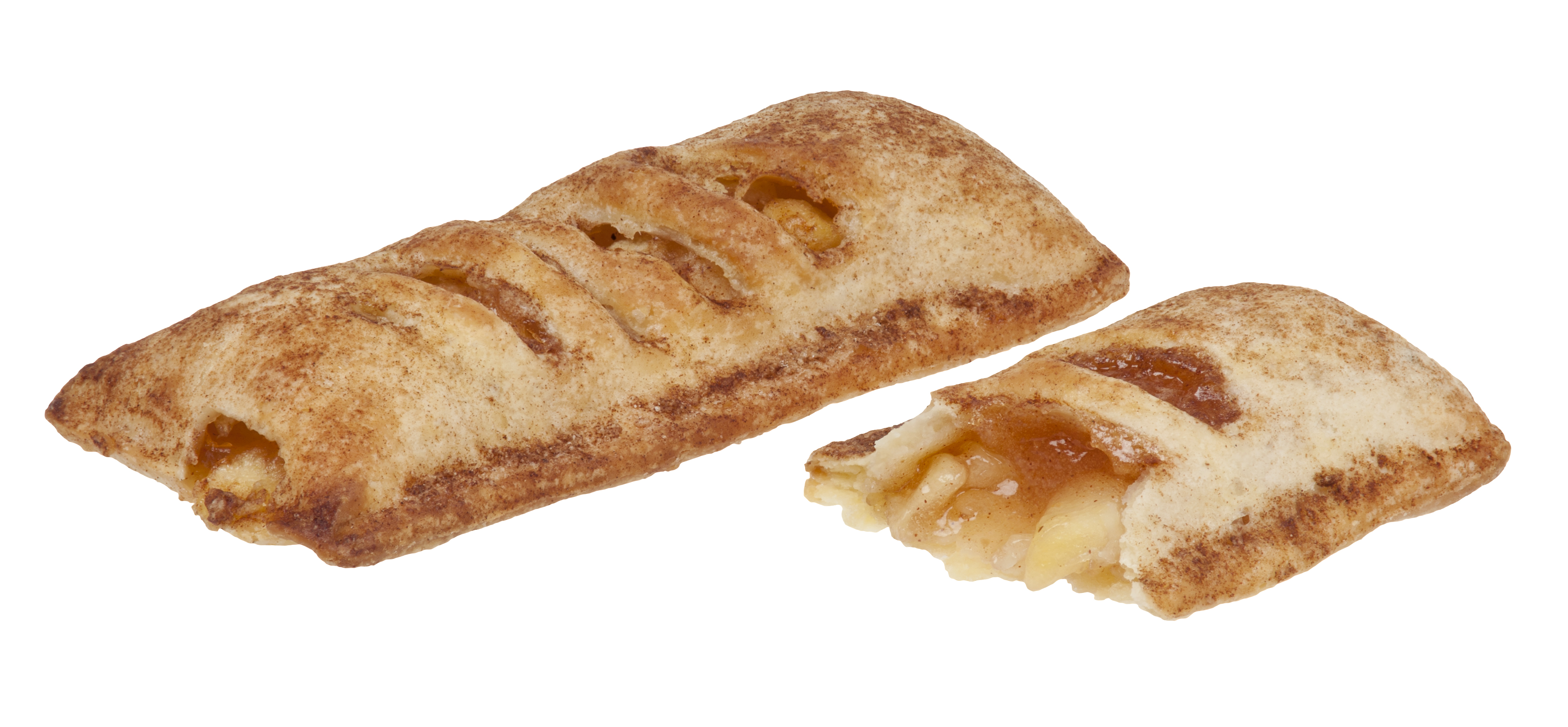
McDonald's fried apple pie returned to restaurants in 2026 for the Semiquincentennial Celebrations of American Independence.

In 1968, fast-food restaurant chain McDonald's introduced its own version of deep fried apple pie, a rectangular product based on a desert from the American South, as suggested by Jo and Litton Cochran of Knoxville, Tennessee. However, the recipe has changed over the years due to health concerns and McDonald's switched to baked pies in 1992. The company re-introduced the fried apple pie for the Semiquincentennial Anniversary of the American Revolution in 2026. The modern recipe for McDonald's fried apple pie features six different varieties of apples—Fuji, Gala, Golden Delicious, Idared, Jonagold, and Rome, all of which can be grown in the United States. According to a 2016 survey, one out of five Americans surveyed (19%) prefer apple pie to all others, followed by pumpkin (13%) and pecan (12%). The unincorporated community of Pie Town, New Mexico, is named after apple pie.

== Serving ==
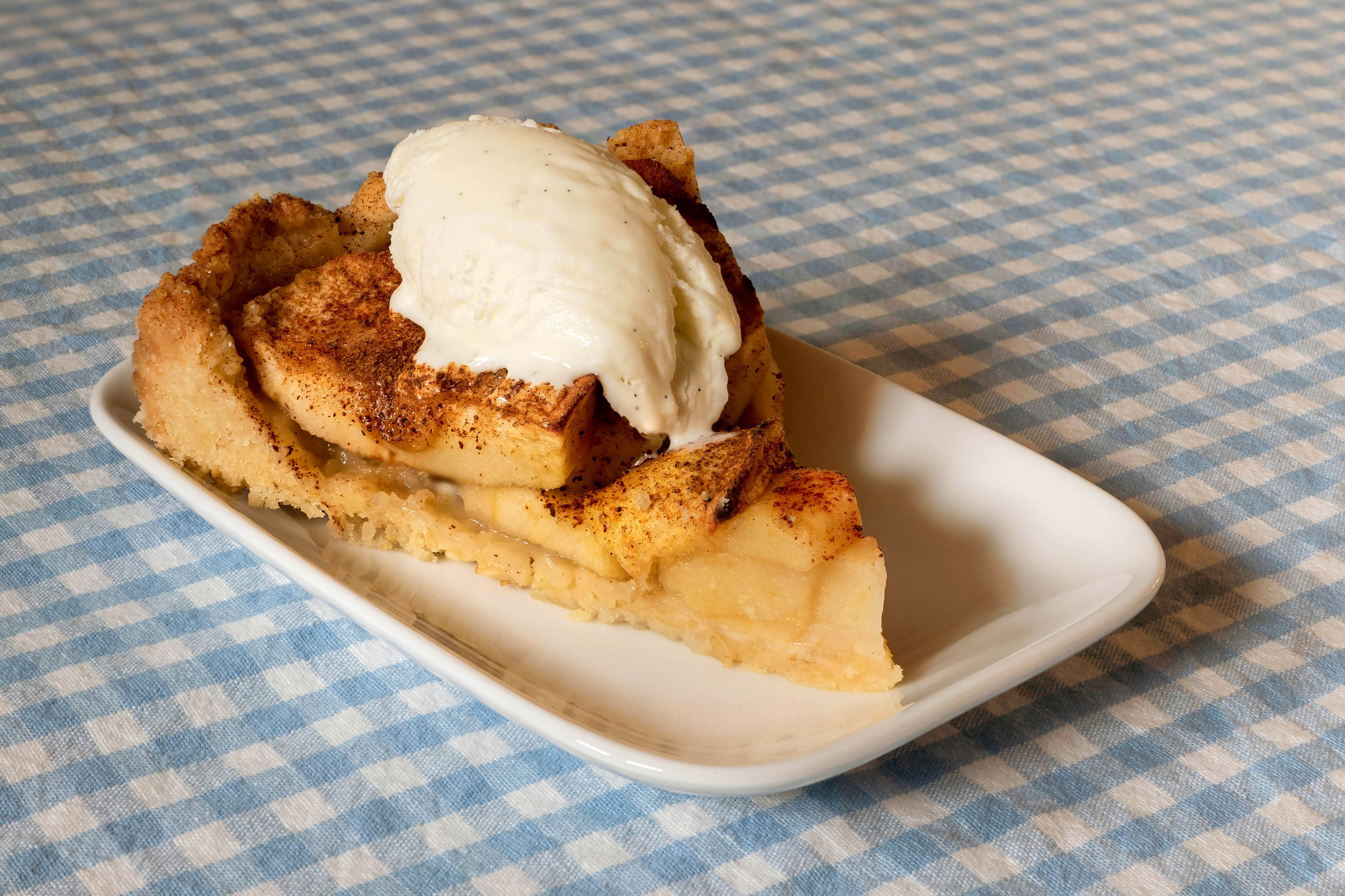
A serving of apple pie topped with vanilla ice cream

In the UK, custard is the traditional serving with apple pie, although cream, either whipped or poured, is also used. Apple pie in the US is often served à la mode, that is, topped with ice cream.

In another serving style originating in 17th century England, a piece of sharp cheddar or Wensleydale cheese is placed on top of a slice of the finished pie. This practice also occurs in the United States and Canada, particularly in regions with dairy farms, such as New England.

== Nutrition ==
Apple pie (US), commercially prepared, enriched flour
Nutritional value per 100 g (3.5 oz)
- Energy: 992 kJ (237 kcal)
- Carbohydrates: 34.0 g
- Sugars: 15.65 g
- Dietary fibre: 1.6 g
- Fat: 11.0 g
- Protein: 1.9 g
Vitamins and minerals
Vitamins	Quantity %DV^{†}
Thiamine (B1)	2% 0.028 mg
Riboflavin (B2)	2% 0.027 mg
Niacin (B3)	2% 0.263 mg
Pantothenic acid (B5)	2% 0.119 mg
Vitamin B6	2% 0.038 mg
Folate (B9)	7% 27 μg
Vitamin C	4% 3.2 mg
Minerals	Quantity %DV^{†}
Calcium	1% 11 mg
Iron	3% 0.45 mg
Magnesium	2% 7 mg
Manganese	8% 0.18 mg
Phosphorus	2% 24 mg
Potassium	2% 65 mg
Sodium	9% 201 mg
Zinc	1% 0.16 mg
- Other constituents: Quantity
- Water: 52.2 g
- Link to USDA Database entry
- ^{†}Percentages estimated using US recommendations for adults, except for potassium, which is estimated based on expert recommendation from the National Academies.

A commercially prepared apple pie in the United States is 52% water, 34% carbohydrates, 2% protein, and 11% fat (table). A reference serving of 100 g (3.5 oz) supplies 237 calories of food energy with no micronutrients in significant amounts (all below 10% DV, table).

== See also ==
- Apple strudel (German Apfelstrudel), a large Austrian pastry made with apples, sugar and spices; similar to pie in that the filling is encased by the pastry, but it is rectangular rather than round and cut like coffee cake or stollen rather than like pie
- Apple turnover, similar to strudel but much smaller and triangular in shape, with a higher proportion of pastry to filling
- Apple cake
- Apple cobbler
- Applesauce cake
- List of apple dishes
- List of pies, tarts and flans
