= Pie à la Mode =

Pie served with ice cream

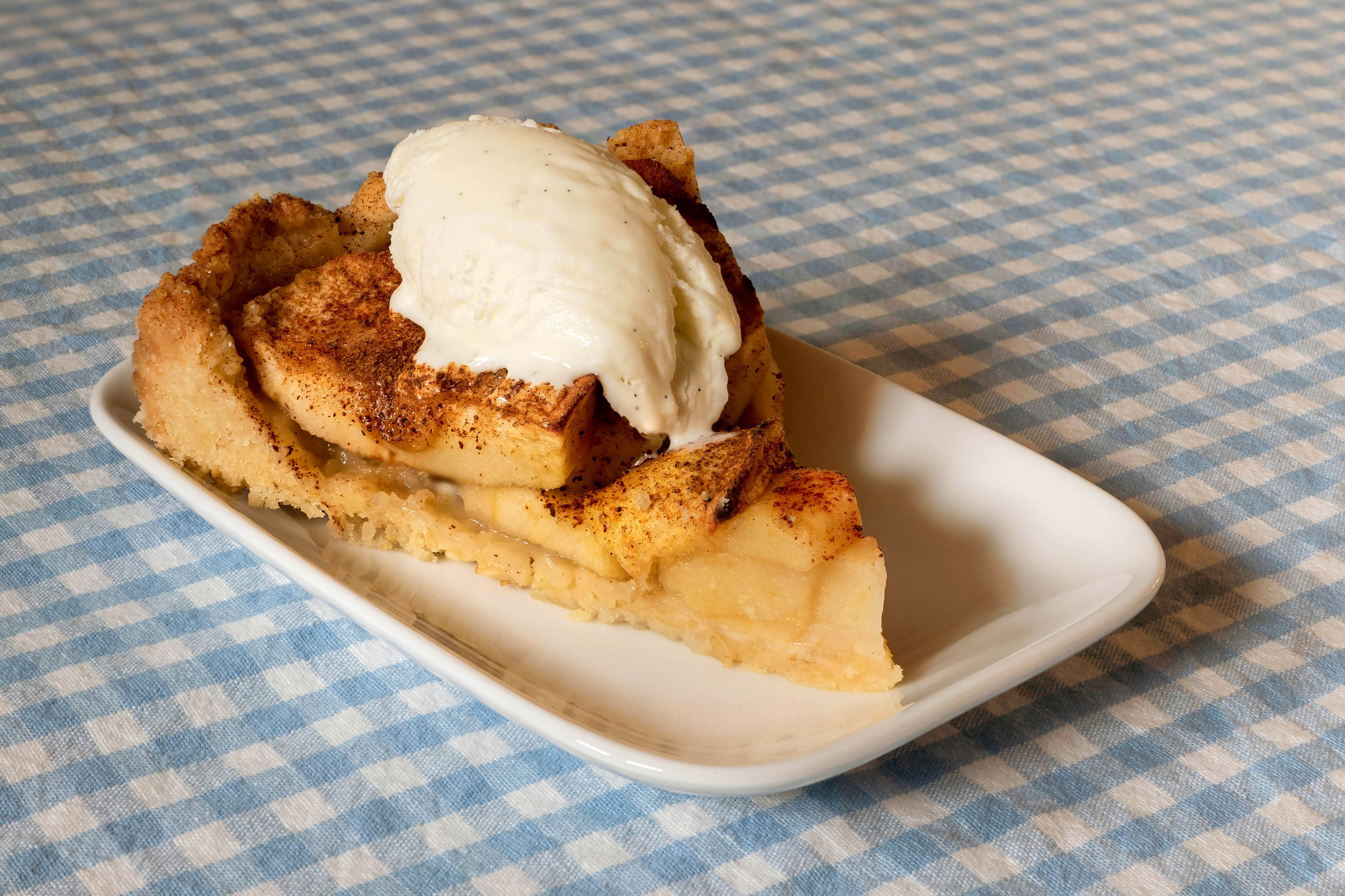
- Apple Pie à la Mode
- Type: Pie
- Course: Dessert
- Place of origin: United States
- Region or state: Minnesota
- Created by: John Gieriet of the Hotel La Perl
- Main ingredients: Pie and Ice cream

Pie à la Mode (literally "pie in the current fashion" or "fashionable pie") is pie served with ice cream. The French culinary phrase à la mode used in the name of this American dessert is also encountered in other dishes such as boeuf à la mode (beef à la mode).

== History ==
Pie à la Mode was allegedly invented at the Cambridge Hotel in Cambridge, Washington County, New York, in the 1890s.

=== Charles Watson Townsend, in Cambridge, NY ===
The claim is that while visiting the hotel, Charles Watson Townsend ordered a slice of apple pie with ice cream. When asked by another guest what he called the dish, he named it Pie à la Mode. Townsend subsequently ordered it by that name every day during his stay. When he later ordered it by that name at Delmonico's Restaurant in New York City, the waiter responded that he had never heard of it. Townsend chastised the waiter by stating:

Do you mean to tell me that so famous an eating place as Delmonico's has never heard of Pie à la Mode, when the Hotel Cambridge, up in the village of Cambridge, NY serves it every day? Call the manager at once, I demand as good serve [sic] here as I get in Cambridge.

The manager, when called by the waiter, declared "Delmonico's never intends that any other shall get ahead of it... Forthwith, pie à la mode will be featured on the menu every day". A reporter for the New York Sun newspaper overheard the disturbance and wrote an article about it the next day. Soon, Pie à la Mode became a standard on menus around the United States.

When Charles Watson Townsend died on May 20, 1936, a controversy developed as to who really invented Pie à la Mode. The New York Times reported that "Pie à la Mode" was first invented by Townsend at the Cambridge Hotel in Cambridge, New York in the late 1800s. It was later reported by several sources that Townsend ordered pie and ice cream at the Cambridge Hotel in 1896, and thus invented the dessert. The legend also states that a reporter from The Sun newspaper in New York overheard a conversation between the manager of Delmonico's Restaurant and Charles Townsend. The reporter was said to have written about the incident in the very next issue of The Sun.

=== John Gieriet in Duluth, Minnesota ===
A reporter from the St. Paul Pioneer Press read Townsend's obituary in the New York Times and considered that the Times had incorrectly attributed the invention of pie à la mode to Townsend. The newspaper accordingly ran a story on May 23, 1936, about how the dessert was in fact invented inside a Superior Street restaurant in Duluth, Minnesota, in the 1880s. The St. Paul newspaper indicated the Duluth restaurant specifically served ice cream with blueberry pie. This was over a decade before Townsend first ordered pie with ice cream in New York, making Duluth the true birthplace of pie à la mode.

A grand opening bill of fare for the Hotel la Perl was published in the March 26, 1885, issue of the Duluth Daily Tribune. The hotel was located at 501–503 West Superior Street in Duluth. The menu showed the hotel restaurant serving both vanilla ice cream and blueberry pie.

The owner of the hotel was John Gieriet. He was born in Tavetsch, Switzerland, on February 6, 1829. He later moved to France where he learned to speak French. Gieriet moved to the United States in 1854. In 1856, Gieriet was put in charge of food service at the White House under the administration of President Franklin Pierce. He continued in that position into the late 1850s when he served under the administration of President James Buchanan.

The Gieriets moved to Duluth in 1885 and purchased the Commercial Hotel, which had been built in 1884 by William Dambruck. John re-named the building Hotel la Perl. It was a large two-story wood-frame building with a flat roof. A saloon located on the first floor was converted into a restaurant and the rear laundry room was remodeled into a kitchen. On the Hotel la Perl's first day of business, Gieriet served up a fancy dinner that included French pickles, oysters, French peas, and Lake Superior trout. For dessert, he served warm blueberry pie and vanilla ice cream. Gieriet called the popular treat "pie à la mode". It was reported in the Duluth Herald that Duluthians in the 1880s often mispronounced the local invention as "pylie mode". In 1886, the Duluth Weekly Tribune stated the Hotel la Perl had gained a "first-class reputation" under Gieriet's management. John continued to operate the Hotel la Perl until his wife became very ill in 1886. He ended up selling the hotel in August of that year.

Pie à la mode was not John Gieriet’s only invention. He received a United States patent for a railroad car ventilating apparatus on June 20, 1882. He also received a patent on October 30, 1899, for a type of fire escape. By 1910, Gieriet had moved to New York City, where he died on May 22, 1912, at the age of 83.

== See also ==
- List of pies, tarts and flans
- bœuf à la mode, a French dish similar to a pot roast
