= Uttwiler Spätlauber =

Apple cultivar

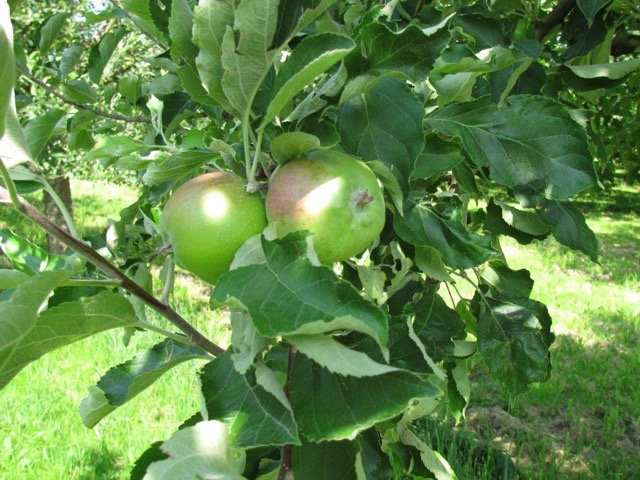
- Genus: Malus
- Species: Malus domestica
- Cultivar: Uttwiler Spätlauber
- Origin: Switzerland, Uttwil

The Uttwiler Spätlauber is an apple cultivar from Switzerland, which is known since about 1750. The exact naming is important, because there are several apple varieties called "Spätlauber". Common to all Spätlauber apple varieties is that they have a late leaf emergence or late leaf fall.

== Description ==
The Uttwiler Spätlauber is a cultivated apple (Malus domestica). It is also a cider and kitchen apple with main distribution in Thurgau (Switzerland). Expert opinions about its ancestry vary, some believe the Uttwiler Spätlauber is a chance seedling from Uttwil.

== Tree ==
The Uttwiler Spätlauber has few demands on soil and climate. The tree thrives best on moderately moist soil in a warm climate with dry, sunny summers. It is not uncommon for flowers to develop as early as the summer shoot.

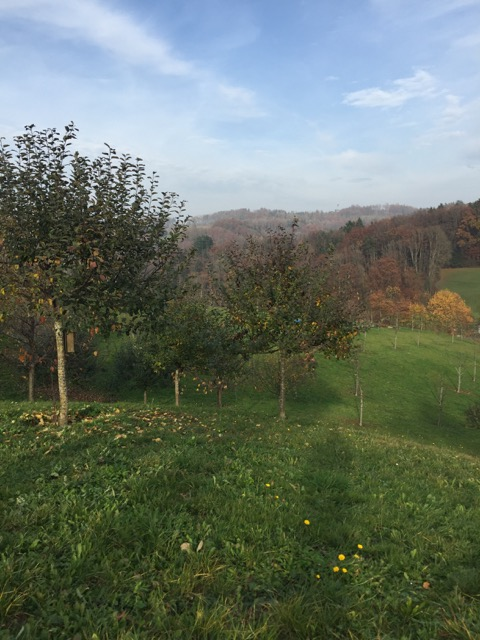
Uttwiler Spätlauber - Trees

== Fruit ==
The fruit is usually round, decreasing somewhat more towards the calyx. The skin is smooth, shiny, green, turning green-yellow only late. With a lot of sunshine fruits show a touch of brownish redness. The flesh is firm and crunchy, like Golden Delicious or Idared. It is also sour with a weak spice. It reaches its picking maturity in mid-October and can be stored for up to a year. The skin then turns brown-black. It is considered to be an acidic all-purpose apple.

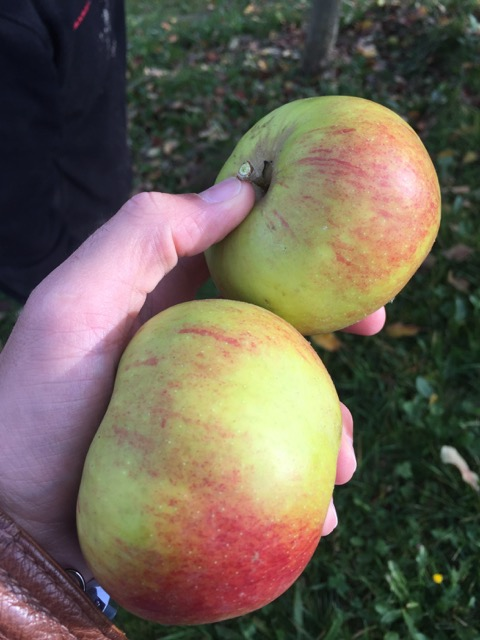
Uttwiler Spätlauber - Fruit

== Distribution ==
Uttwiler Spätlauber is a rare apple variety today. It is integrated into the National Action Plan for the Conservation of Plant Genetic Resources in Food and Agriculture (NAP-PGREL) of Switzerland.

== Usage in the cosmetics industry ==
The plant stem cell extract of the Uttwiler Spätlauber is used today in many cosmetic anti-wrinkle and anti-aging care products.
