= Wagener (apple) =

Apple cultivar

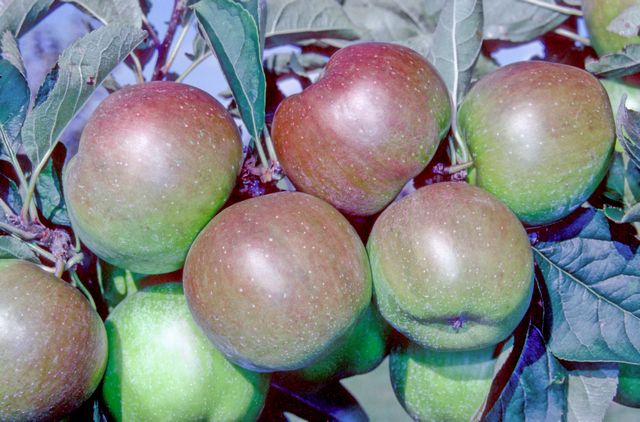
- Cultivar: 'Wagener'
- Origin: Penn Yan, New York, United States, around 1791

The Wagener (also called Wagener Price and Wagoner) is a cultivar of the domesticated apple. It was first farmed in 1791 in New York, and is the parent of the Idared and, possibly, the Northern Spy. Despite the early popularity of the Wagener, it is no longer widely grown.

== History ==
In 1791, George Wheeler started a seedling farm in the area of Penn Yan, New York, with apple seeds that he had brought from Dutchess County, New York. Abraham Wagener, the namesake for the Wagener apple, purchased the nursery in 1795 and planted the trees on his land. The apple was recognized by the New York State Agricultural Society in 1847, and began to be propagated extensively in the United States. In 1910, it was brought to England where it received an Award of Merit from the Royal Horticultural Society.

== Appearance and flavor ==
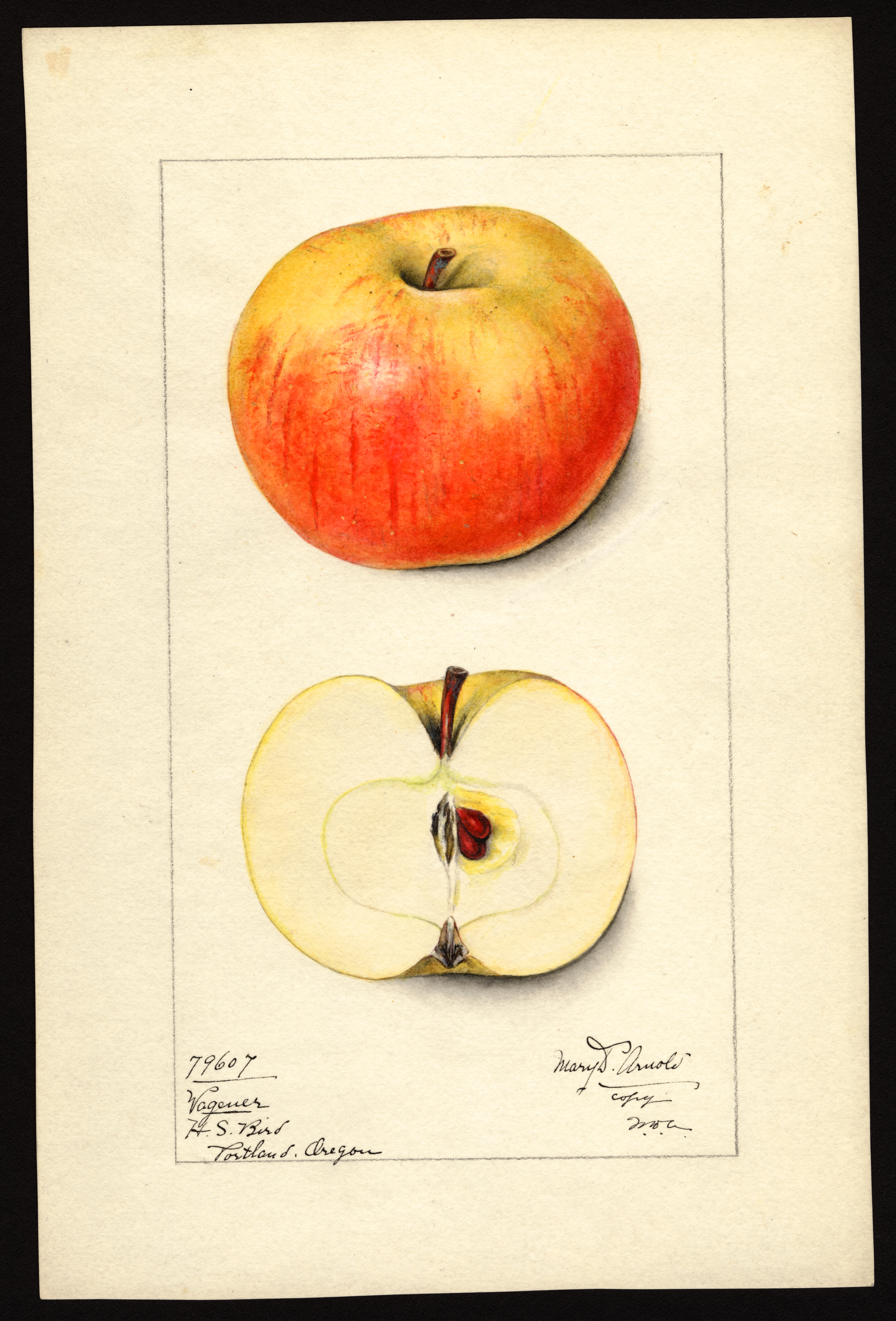

- Tree thrifty upright, productive and very early bearer.
- Fruit medium-sized apple with a flattened, sometimes irregular, shape.
- Typical size: width 76-88 mm, height 57-63 mm, stalk 13 - 26 mm. The color is mostly red with yellow highlights near the crown.
- Flesh is white to cream-colored, very crisp, fine-grained, and tender, with a sweet-tart flavor.
- Eye small closed
- Core heart shaped, closed.

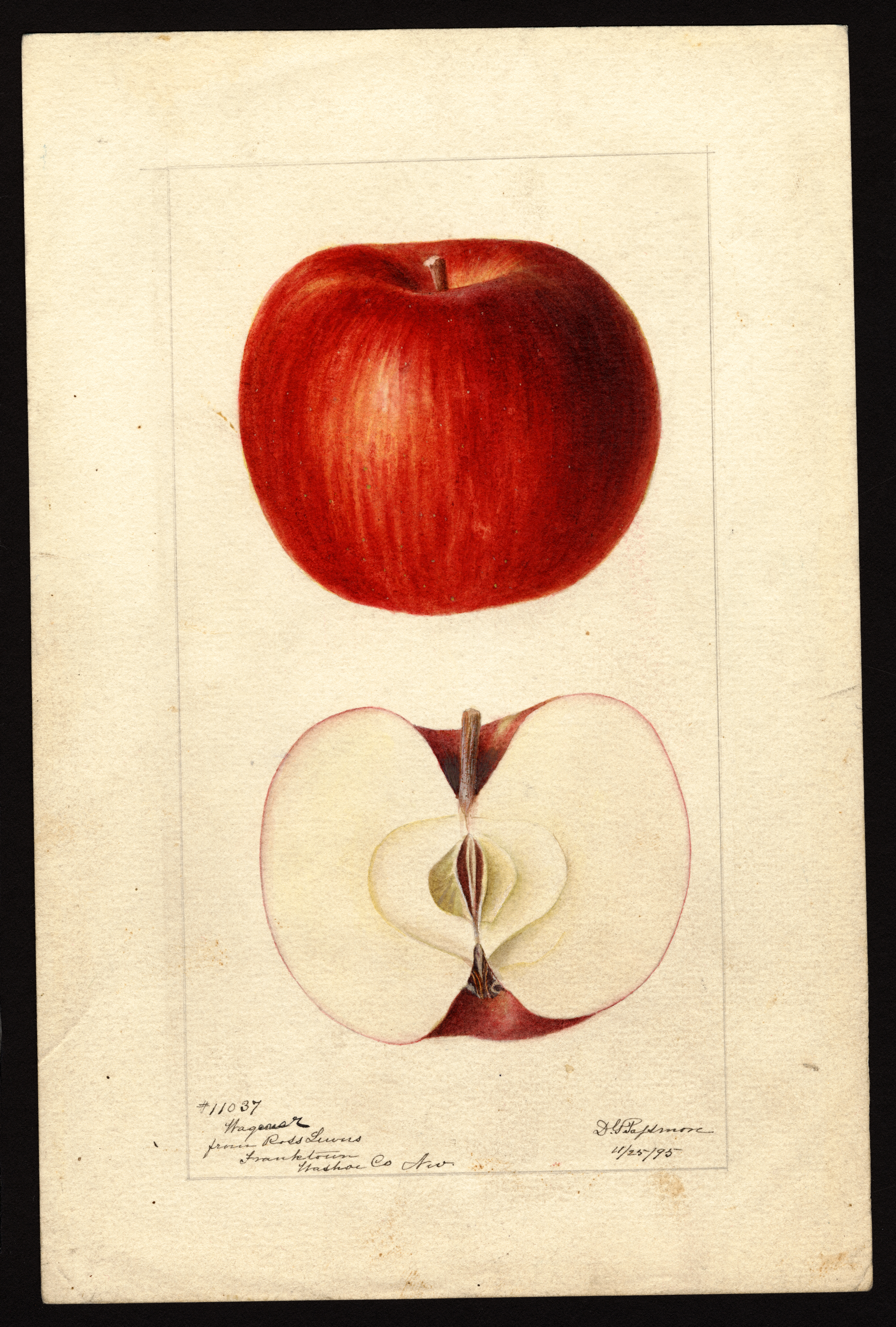

== Cultivation ==
The tree grows quickly and is an early fruit producer, contributing to its popularity among farmers wanting an early return from their orchards. The Wagener is criticized for its over-production which can result in crowding and production of low-quality fruit. Without proper pruning and thinning of the developing fruit, the health of the trees can suffer.

Wagener
----	When to pick	When ripe enough to eat	Latest cold storage limit
In Northern states	Sept. 20 - Oct. 6	Nov. 15-25	Feb. 1
In Southern states	Aug. 31 - Sept. 20	Oct. 25 - Nov. 5	Dec. 15
