= Boeuf à la mode =

French braised beef dish

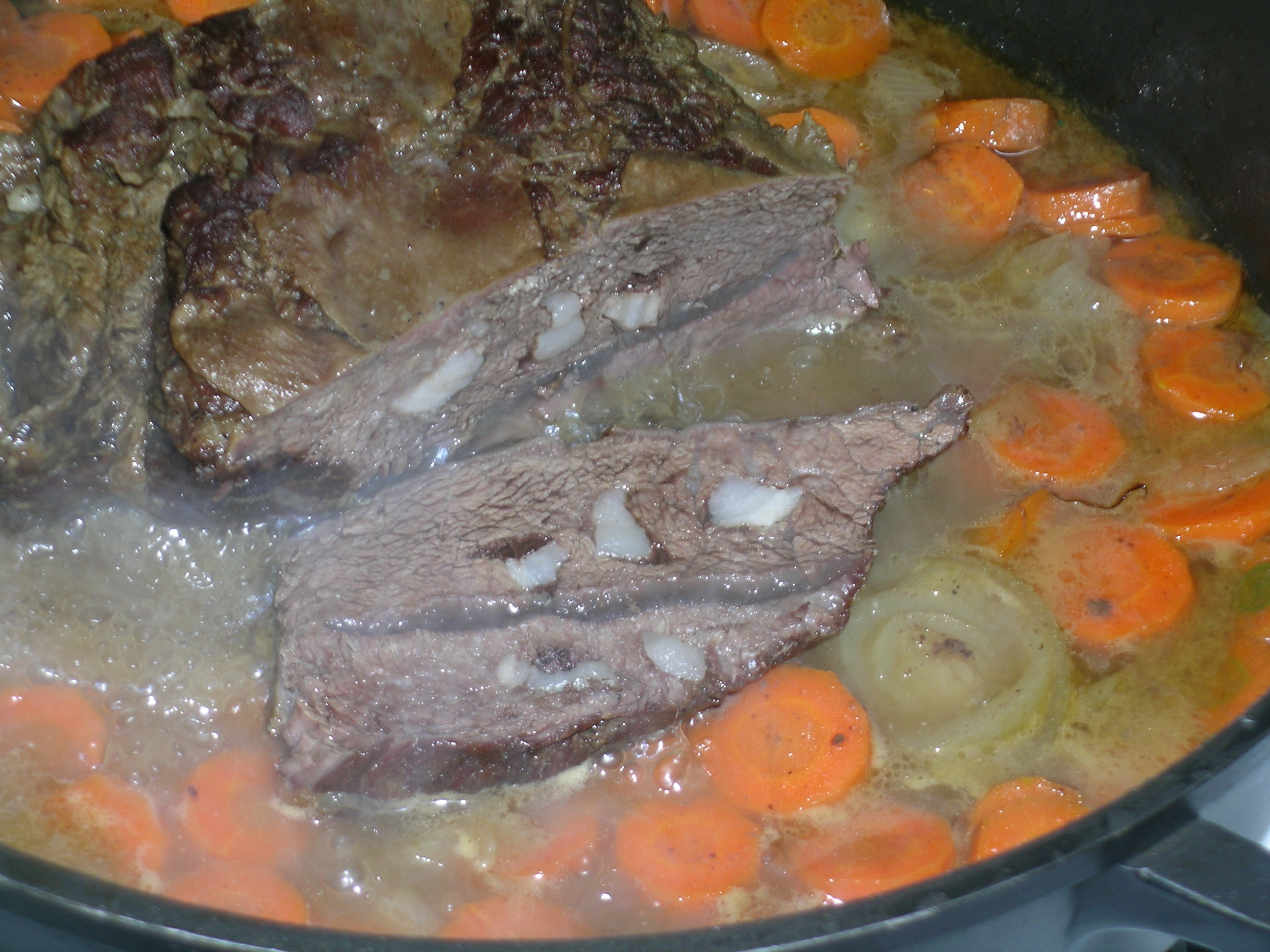
Bœuf à la mode

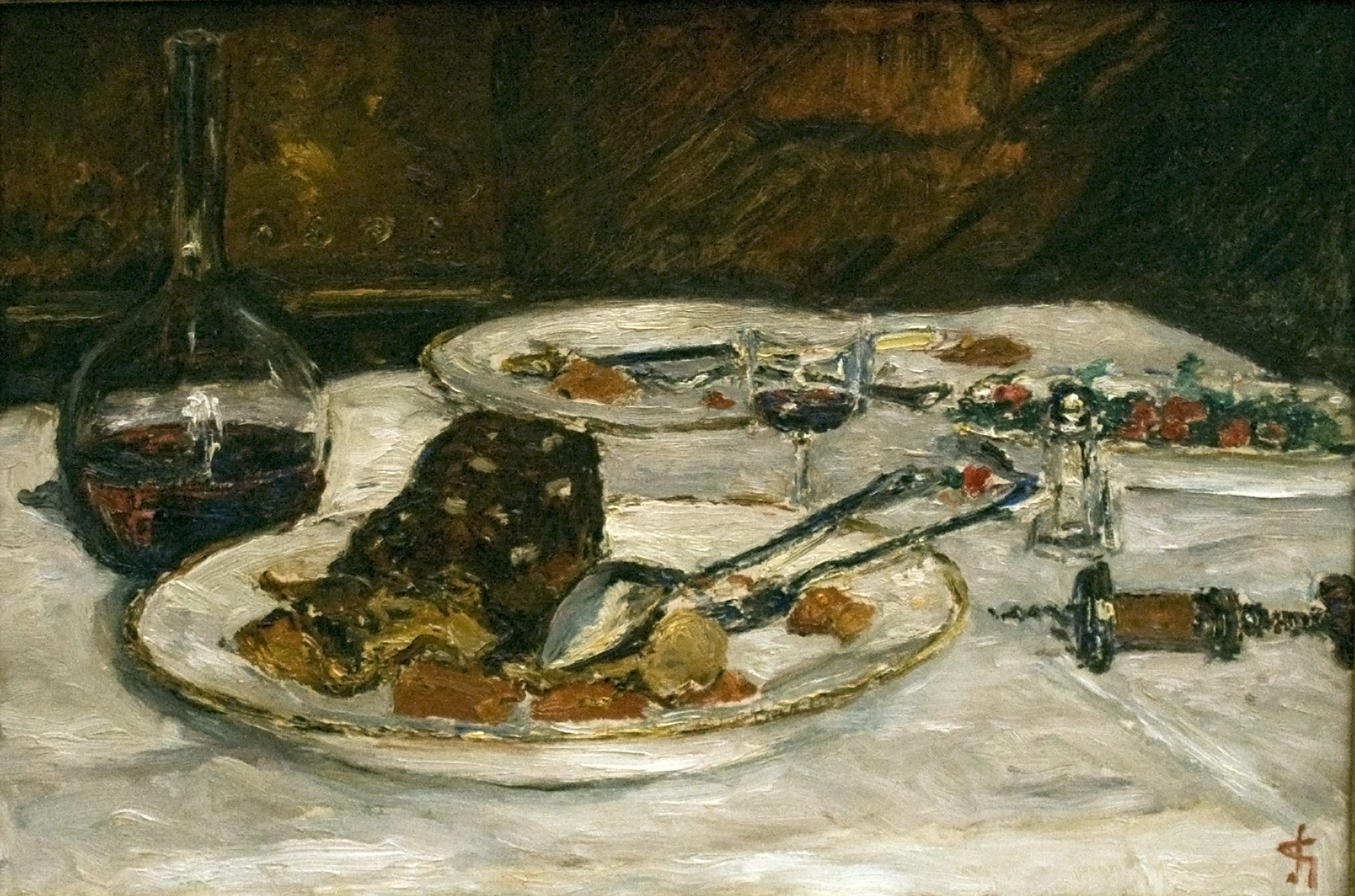
Charles Storm van 's Gravesande (1841–1924), Bœuf à la mode, 1906, oil on canvas, Teylers Museum, Haarlem

Beef à la mode or bœuf à la mode (French pronunciation: [bœf a la mɔd]) is a French dish of a piece of beef braised in stock and wine with carrots and onions.

== Variations ==
In French recipes, the preferred cut is the pointe de culotte, the rump cap. In older recipes, it is invariably larded. Most recipes start by marinating the meat in wine. It is first browned in fat then braised in a liquid composed primarily of stock or broth and red or white wine with carrots, onions, and herbs. Modern recipes often include celery. Some recipes add tomatoes, while others add brandy or other distilled spirits. Most French recipes include a boned calf's foot to add gelatin to the braising liquid, which serves to thicken the resulting sauce.

To finish the dish, the braised beef is removed and set aside to rest. Meanwhile, the braising liquid is strained and reduced to a sauce. The beef is sliced and served with this sauce. In simple versions à la ménagère 'housewife style', the vegetables from the braising liquid are served as the garnish. In more elaborate versions à la bourgeoise 'classy style', the vegetables that have cooked with the meat are strained out, and freshly cooked carrots and onions are added.

The braising liquid varies from all-stock, to about 1:3 wine to stock, to all wine. One American recipe from 1896 uses just water.

== History ==
In English, the dish was formerly called both "beef à la mode" and "à la mode beef" (sometimes spelled "alamode"). In French, it is now often called boeuf mode.

This dish has also found its way into Bavarian cuisine. Known as Böfflamott, it is a classic of refined Sunday dining and traditional tavern fare.

== See also ==
The dictionary definition of a la mode at Wiktionary

- Bœuf bourguignon
