= Northern Spy =

Apple cultivar

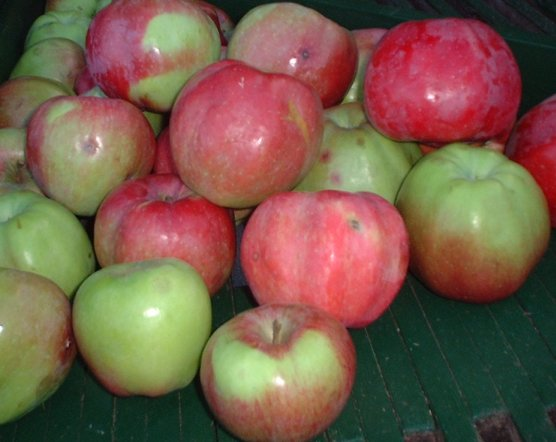
- Species: Malus domestica
- Cultivar: Northern Spy
- Origin: (United States) East Bloomfield, New York, 1840

Northern Spy, also called Spy and King, is a cultivated variety or cultivar apple that originated on the farm of Oliver Chapin in East Bloomfield, New York, in about 1840. It is popular in upstate New York.

The Northern Spy was one of four apples honored by the United States Postal Service in a 2013 set of four 33¢ stamps commemorating historic strains, joined by Baldwin, Golden Delicious, and Granny Smith.

== Description ==
Northern Spy produces fairly late in the season (late October and beyond). Skin color is a green ground, flushed with red stripes where not shaded. The white flesh is juicy, crisp and mildly sweet with a rich, aromatic subacid flavor, noted for high vitamin C content. Its characteristic flavor is tarter than most popular varieties, and its flesh is harder or crunchier than most, with a thin skin.

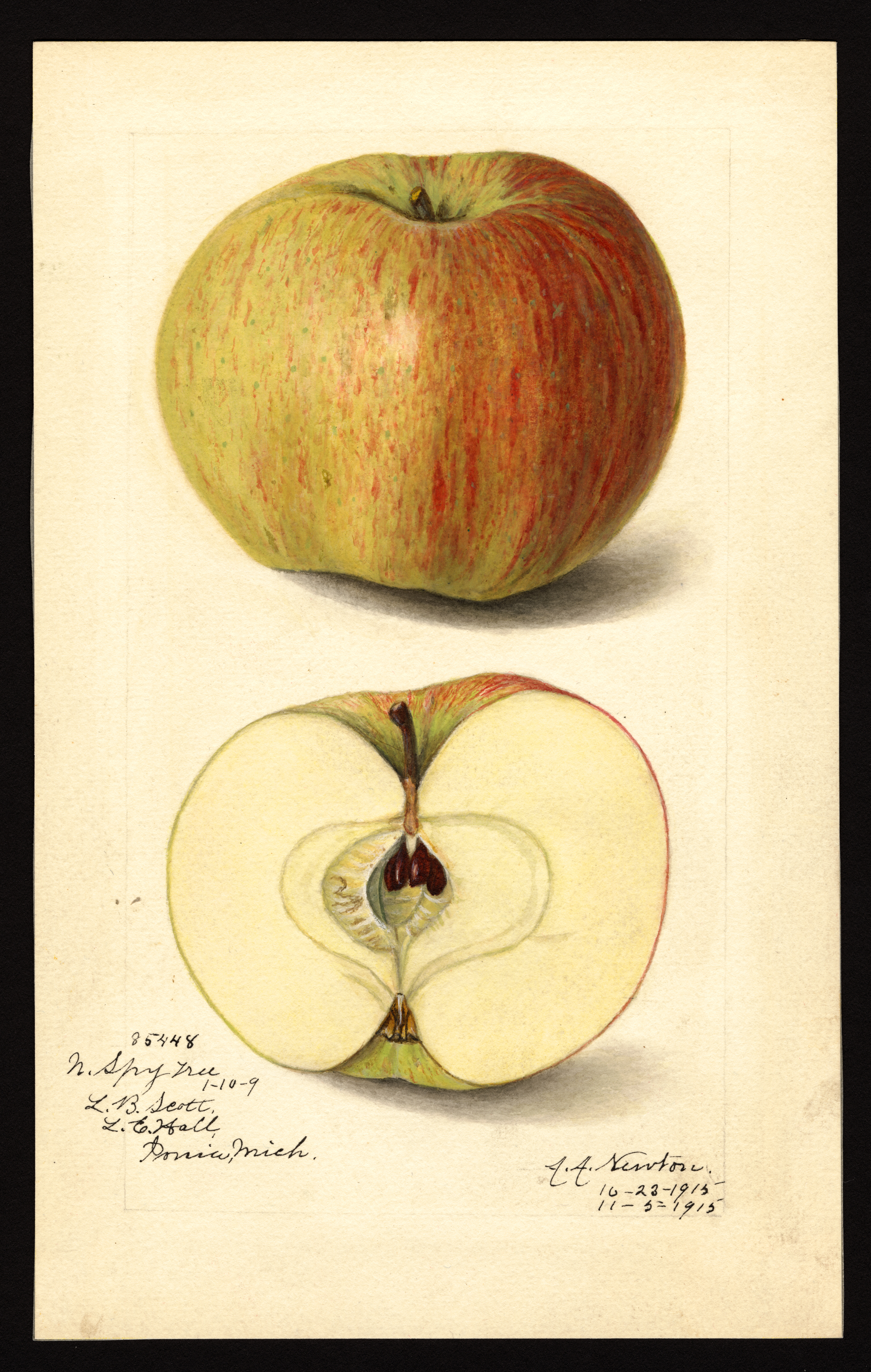
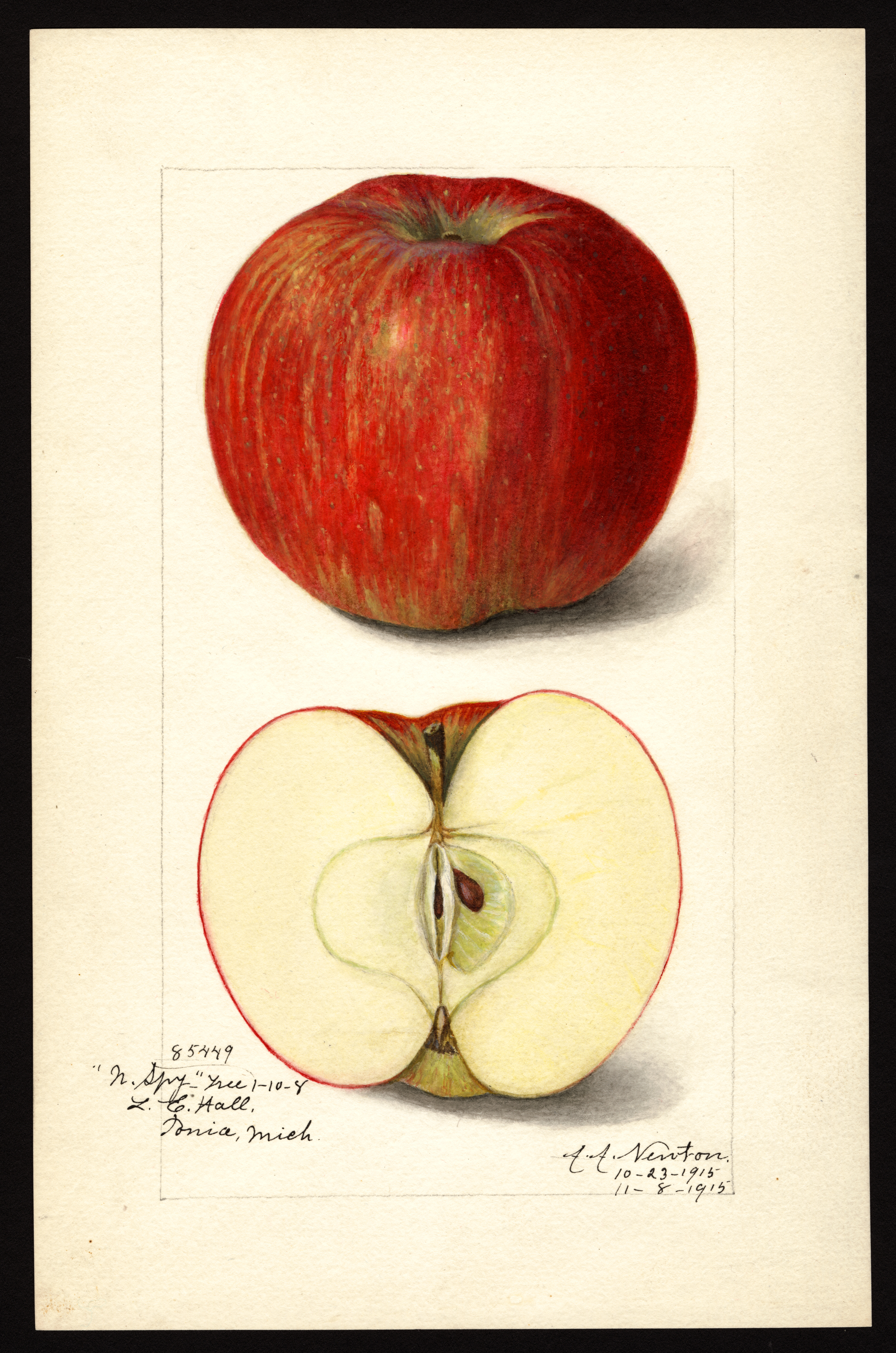

== Uses ==
Northern Spy is commonly used for desserts and pies, as well as juice and cider. It is an excellent apple for storage, tending to last long due to late maturation.

== Cultivation and history ==
The Northern Spy was discovered around 1800 in East Bloomfield, New York, south of Rochester, New York, as surviving sprouts of a seedling cultivated from stock brought in from Connecticut that had failed. The Wagener apple is believed to be one of its forebears. It fell somewhat out of favor due to its dull coloration, irregular shape, tendency of the thin skin to allow bruising, and lack of disease resistance, specifically to bitter pit and blossom fireblight, but it is resistant to woolly aphid and somewhat to scab. It is not widely available at retail outside its growing regions but still serves as an important processing apple in those areas. The Northern Spy is known for taking as much as a decade to bear fruit, unless grafted to a non-standard rootstock. In spite of this, it makes an excellent root stock for grafting other varieties to become standard-size trees.

A Northern Spy apple tree figures in the poem "Conrad Siever" in Edgar Lee Masters' Spoon River Anthology, and in the poetry of Chase Twichell, whose first book Northern Spy was published by the University of Pittsburgh Press in 1981.

A box of Northern Spies was sent to Senator Joseph McCarthy by the news staff of the Toronto Globe and Mail in 1953 as a joke.
