= Lattice (pastry) =

Decorative pastry on baked goods

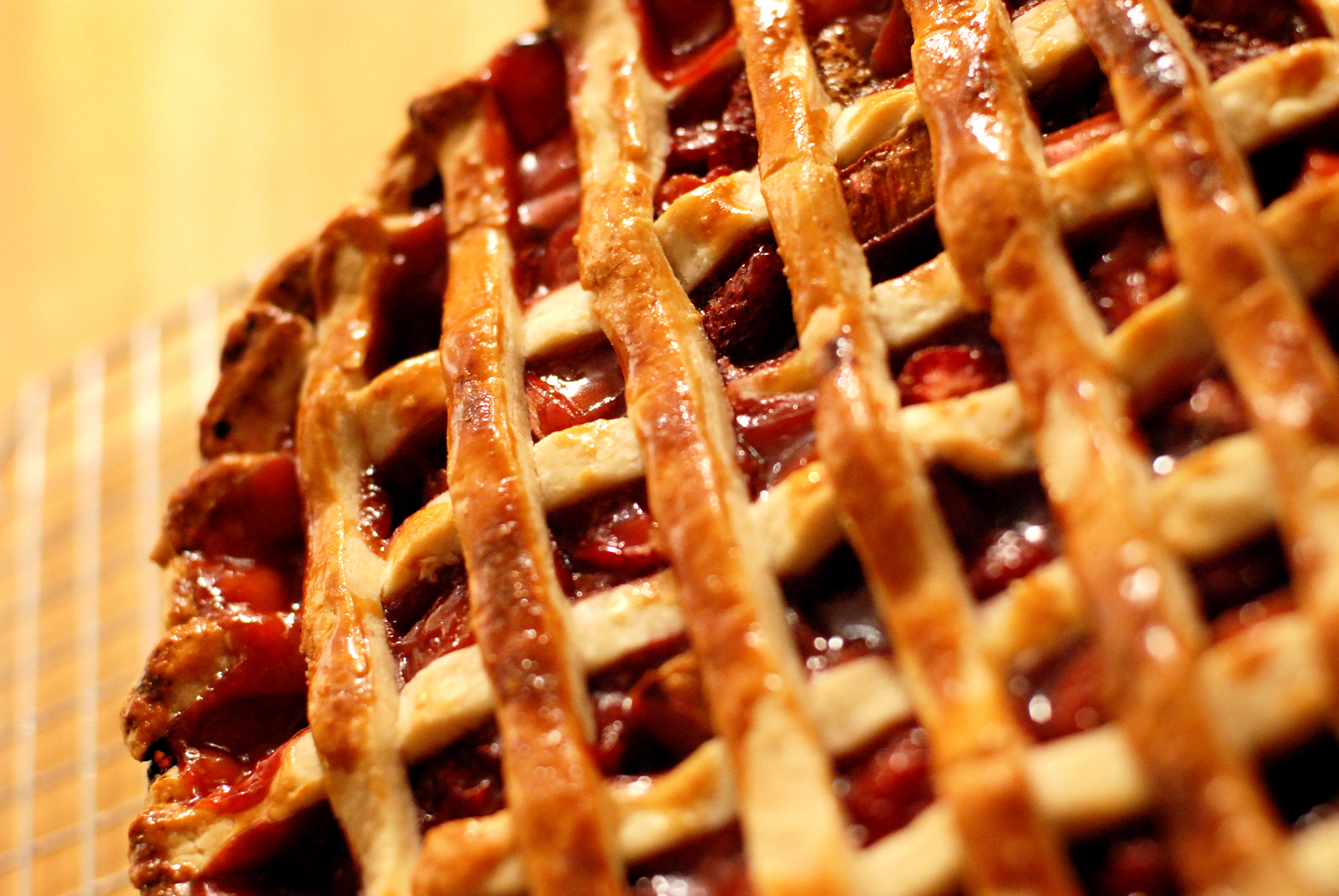
- Strawberry-rhubarb pie with lattice pastry
- Type: Pastry
- Place of origin: Unknown

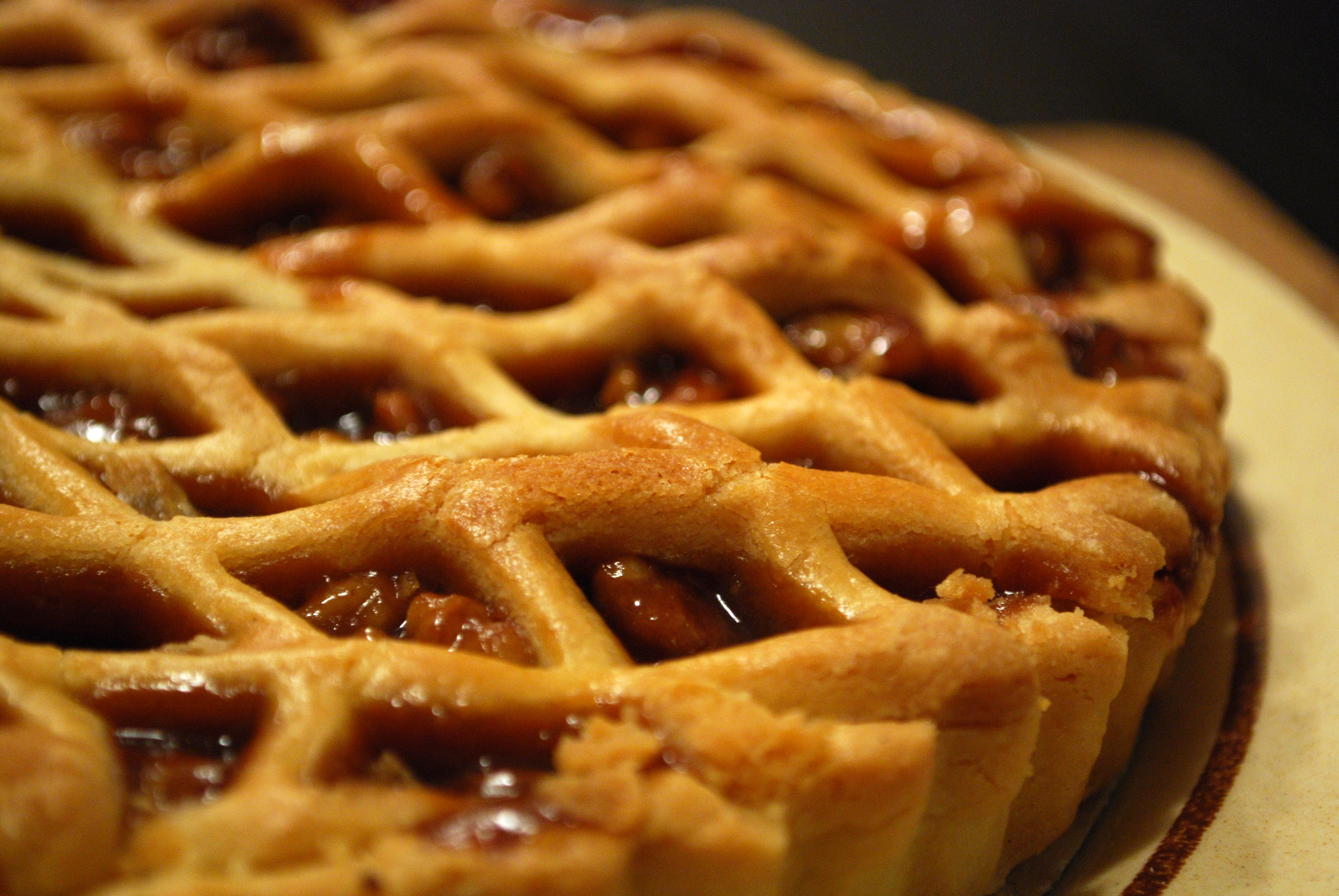
Closeup of a peekaboo lattice

Lattice pastry is when pastry is woven in a criss-crossing pattern of strips in the preparation of various foods. Latticed pastry is used as a type of lid on many various tarts and pies. The openings between the lattice allow fruit juices in pie fillings to evaporate during the cooking process, which can caramelize the filling.

Latticing can also be achieved by cutting horizontal rows of slits into a whole pie crust and pulling gently to open the slits, a technique known as a "peekaboo" lattice.

Latticing a piecrust
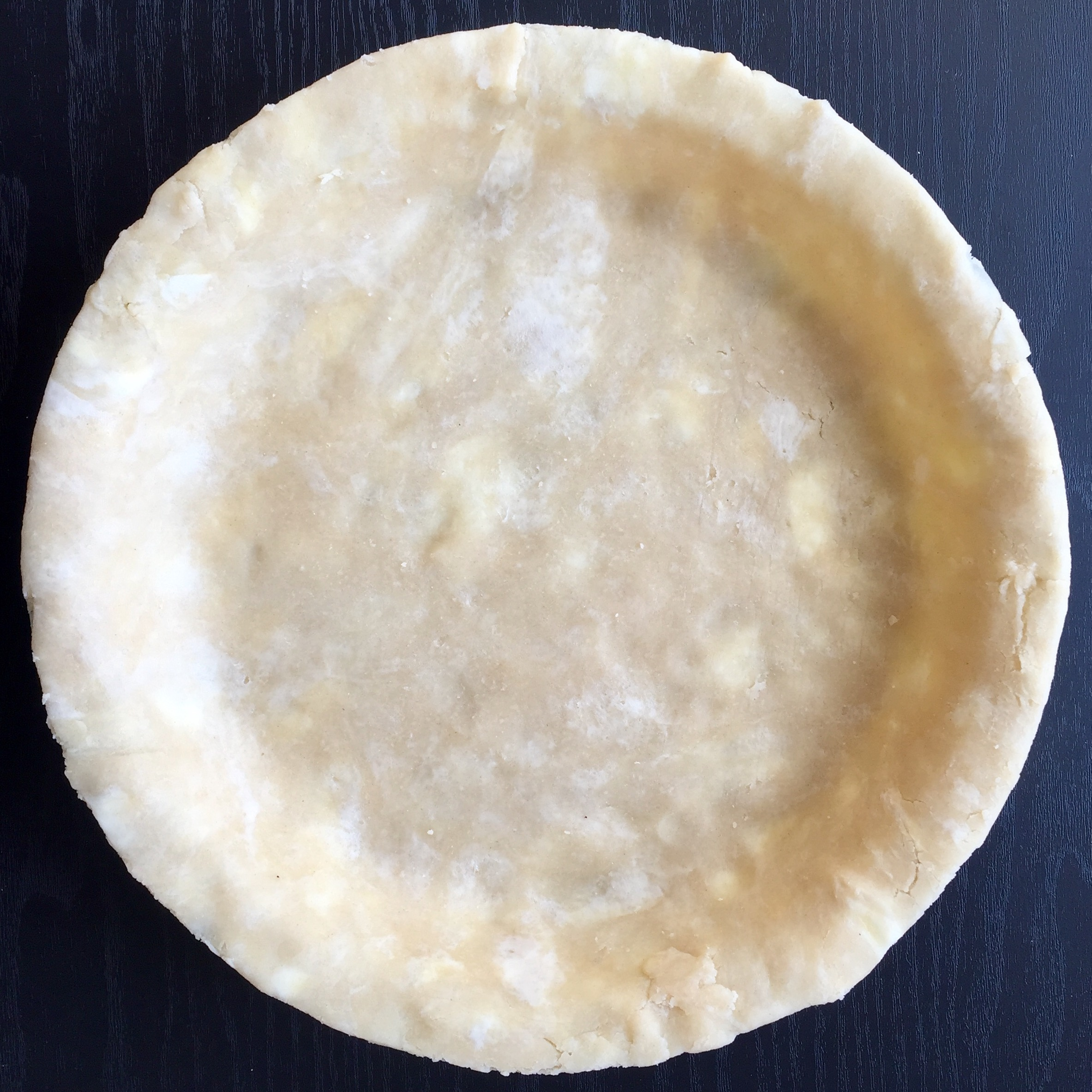
Bottom crust

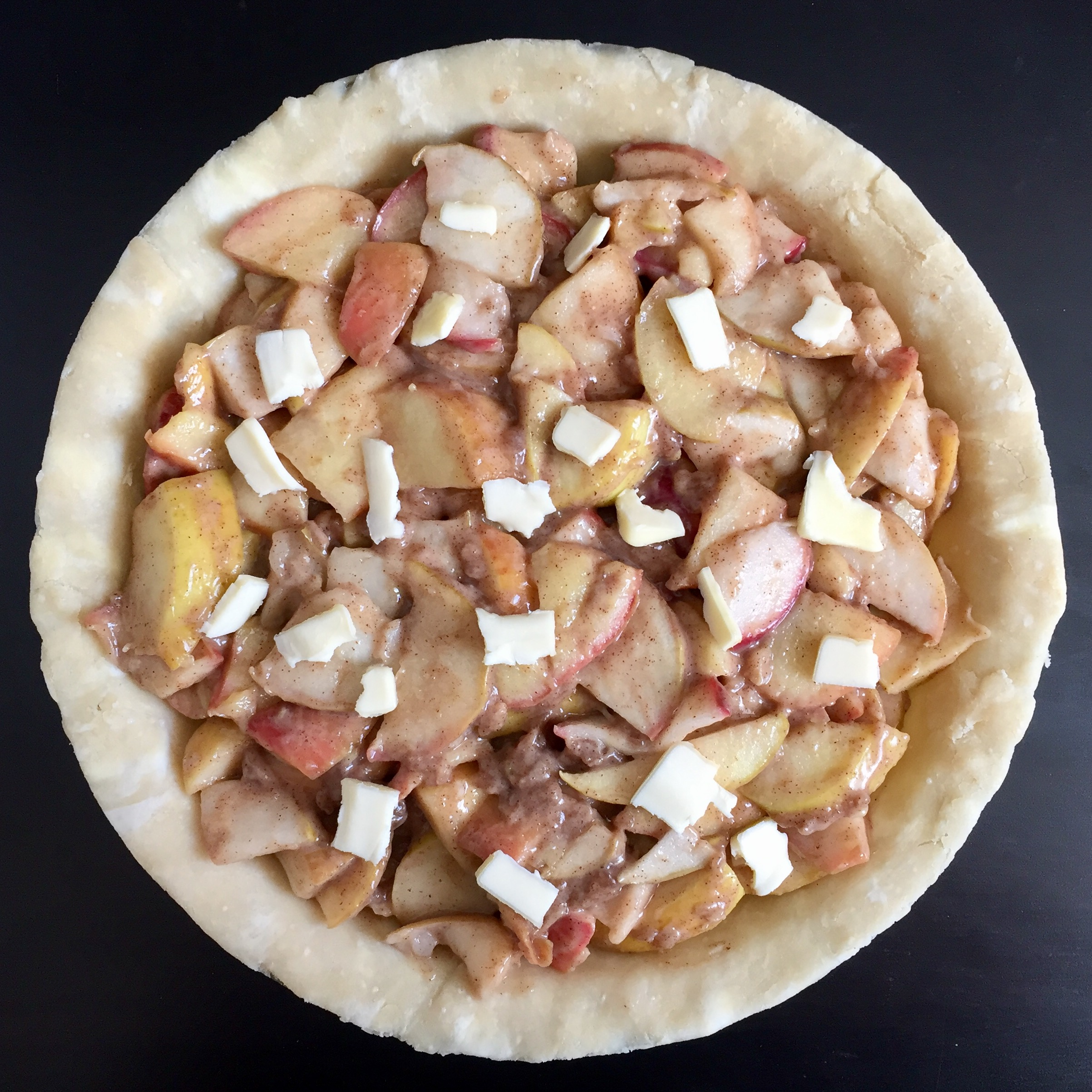
Filled crust

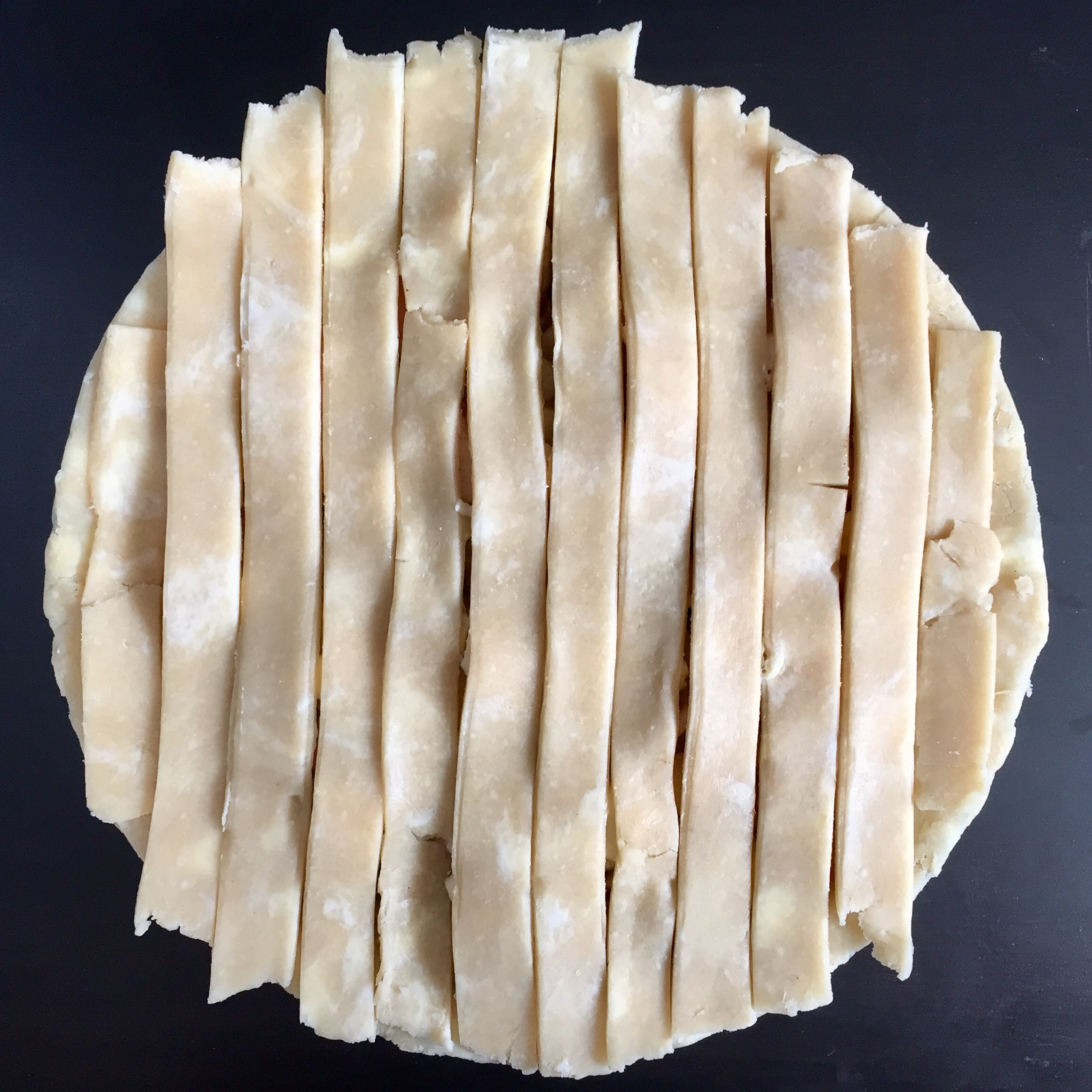
Starting latticework

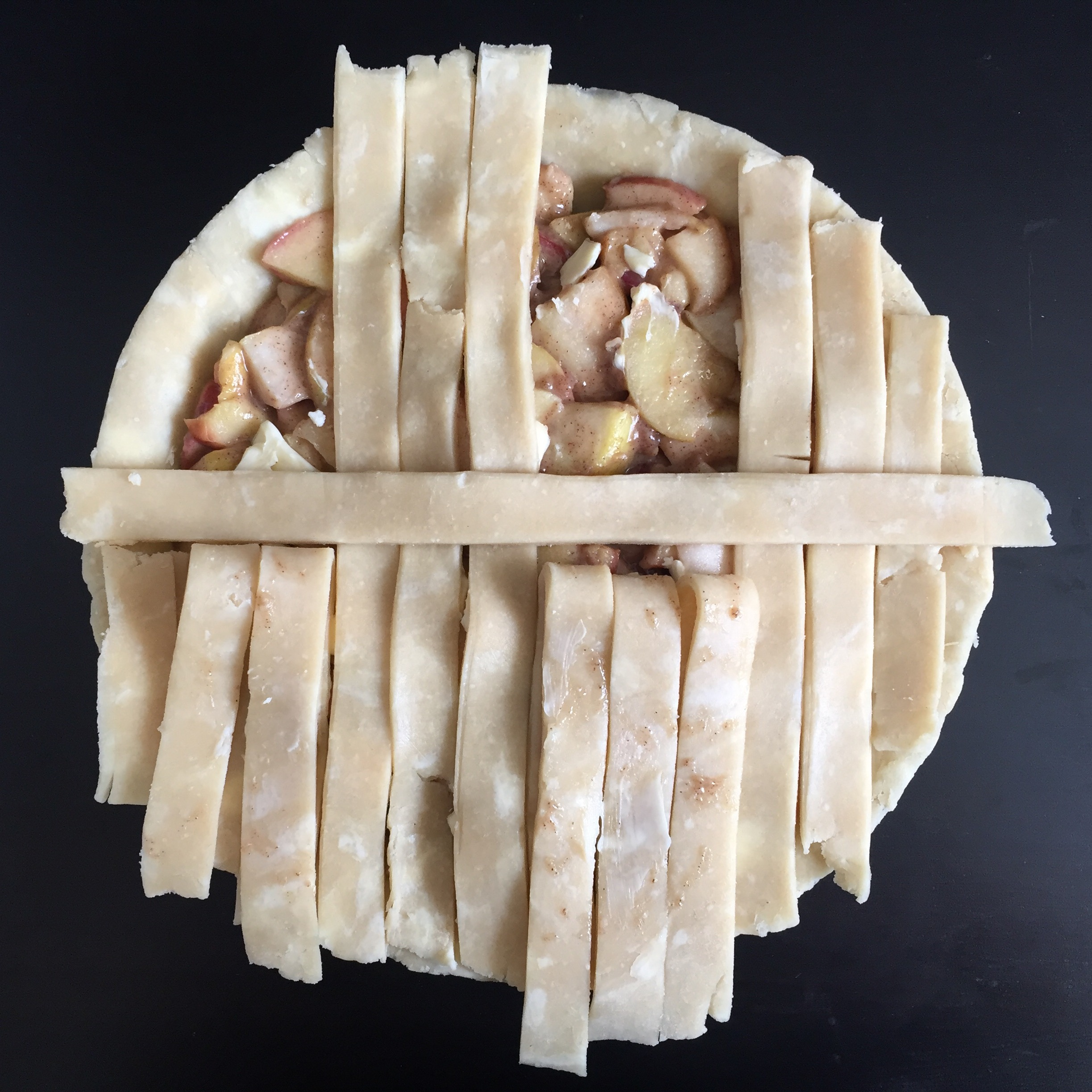
Latticing

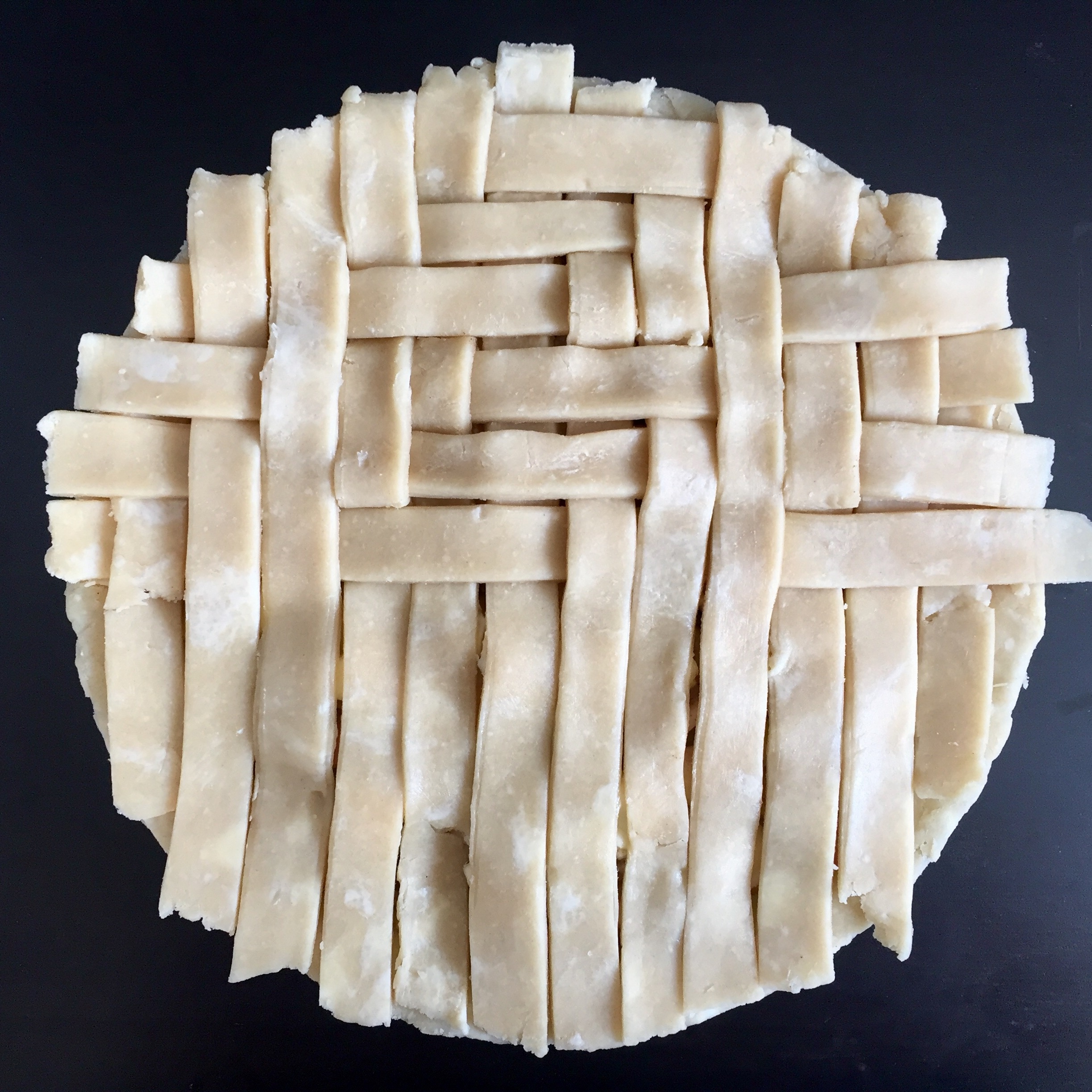
Latticing continues in a herringbone pattern

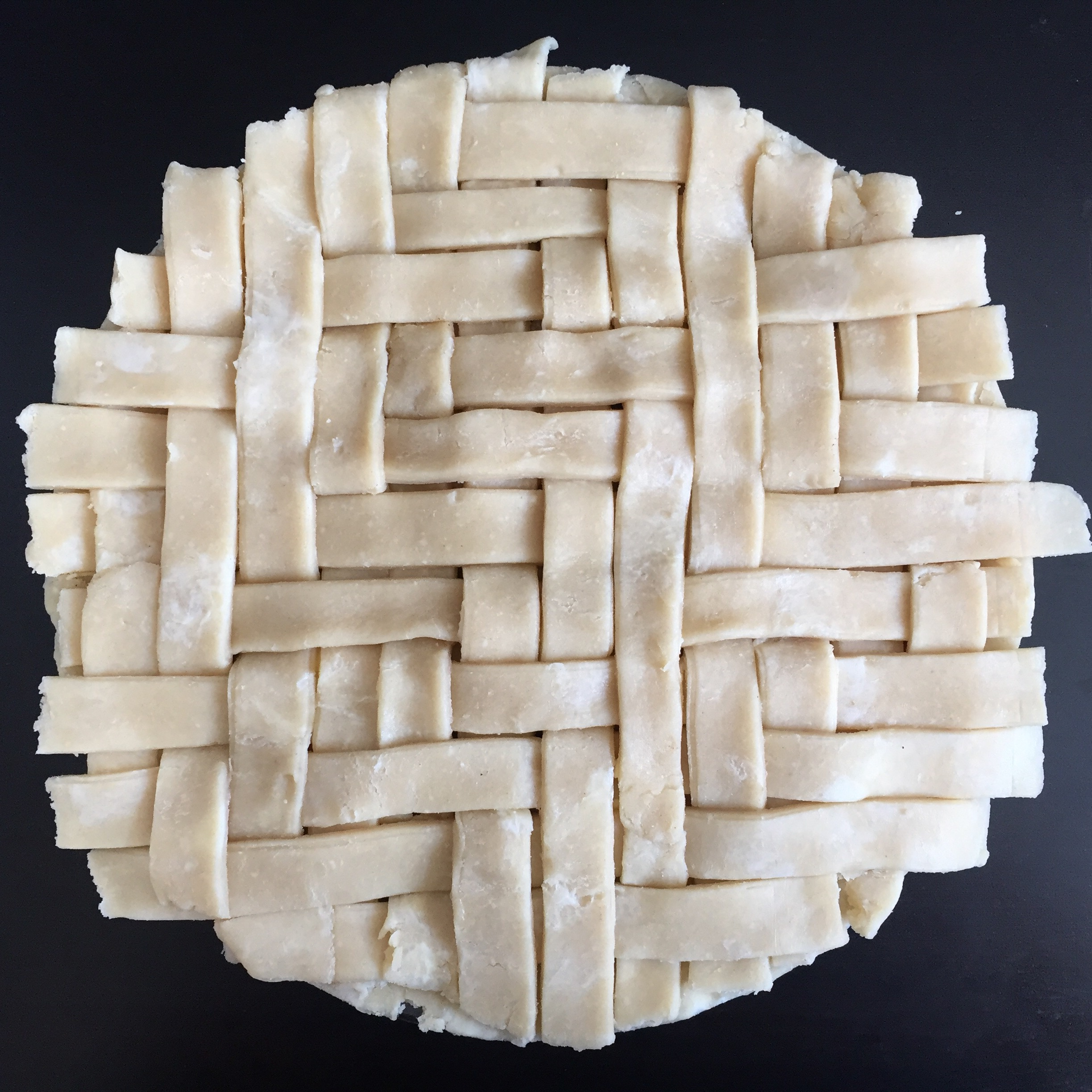
Latticing finished

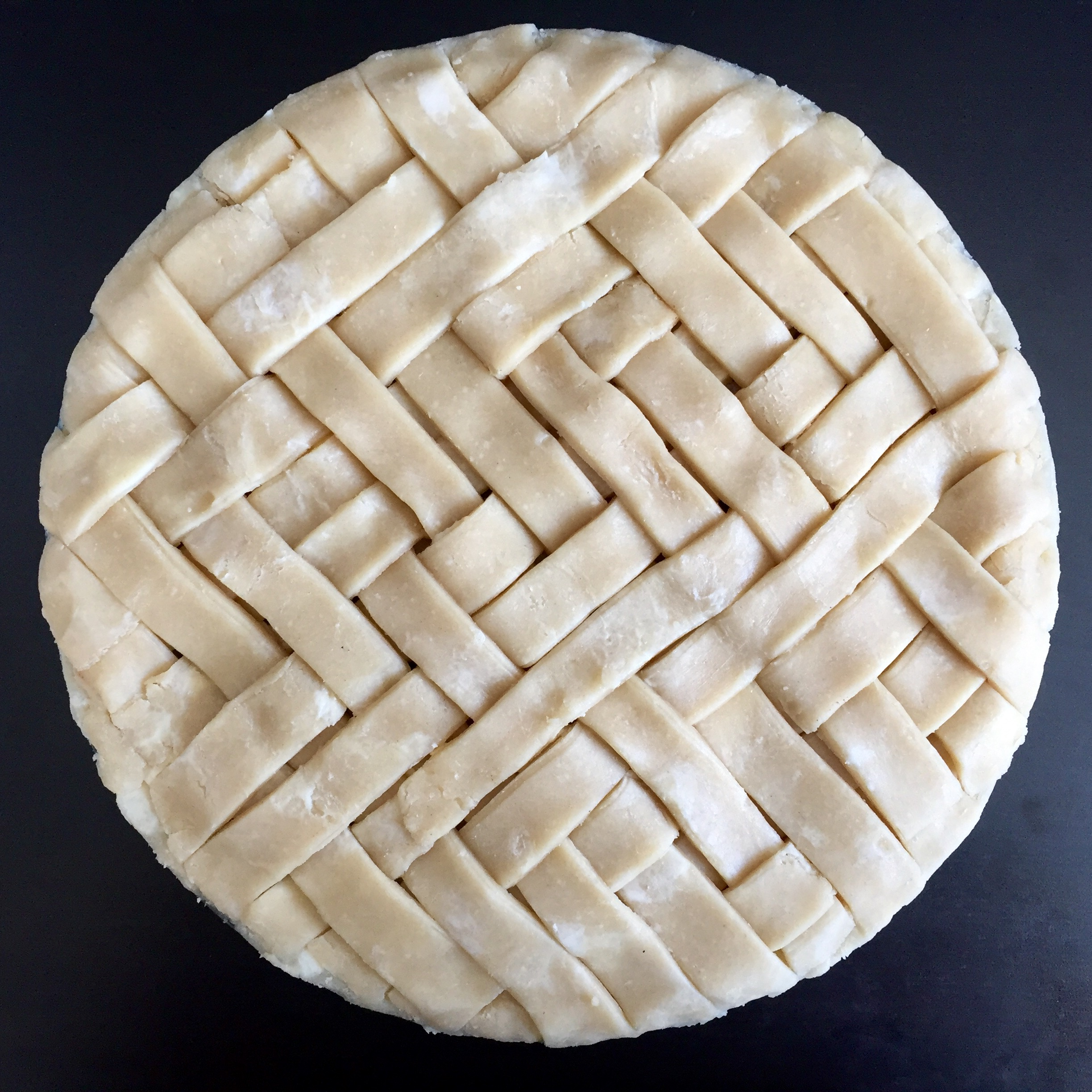
Crimped crust, ready for baking

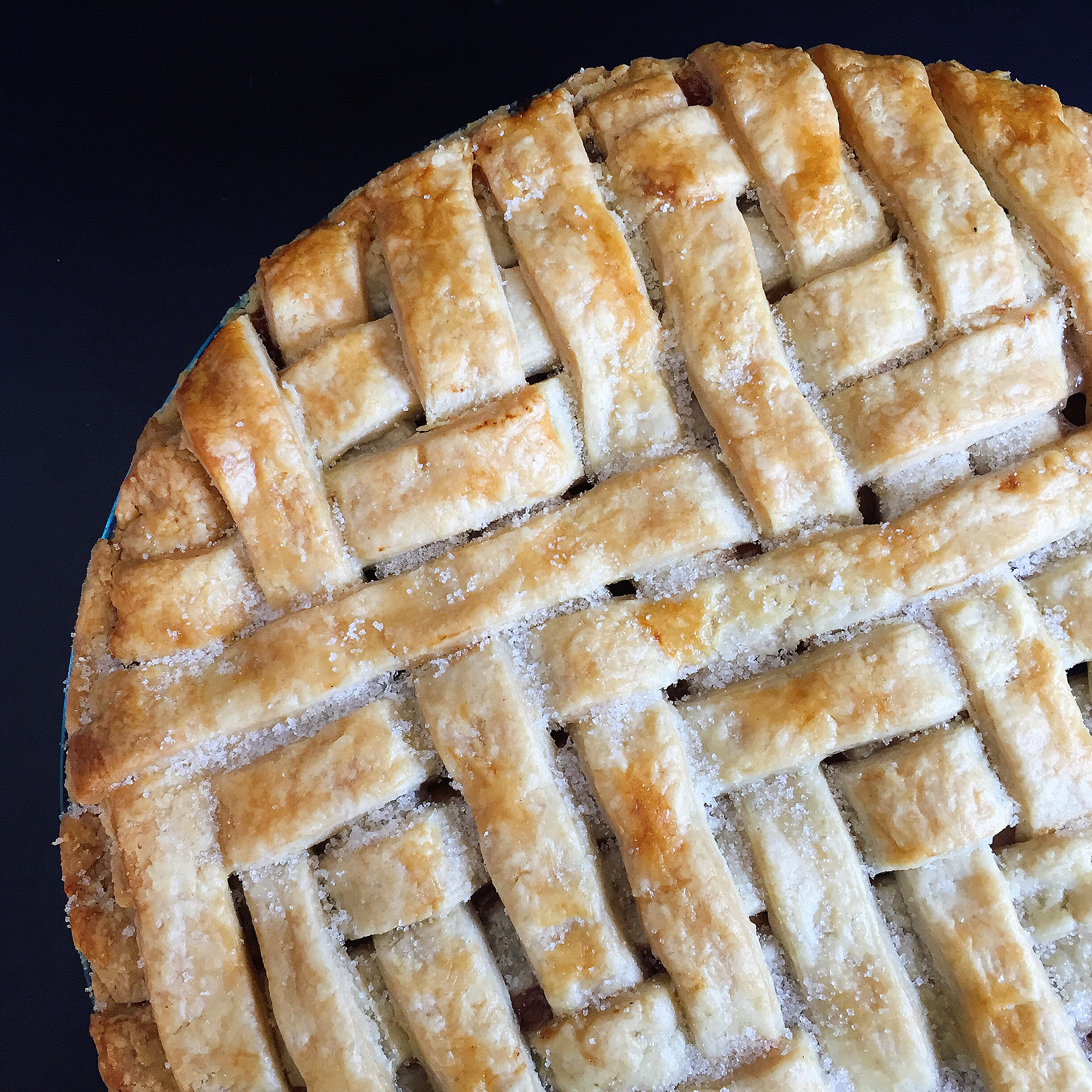
Baked herringbone lattice piecrust

== See also ==
- Latticework
