= Carel Nicolaas Storm van 's-Gravesande =

Dutch painter

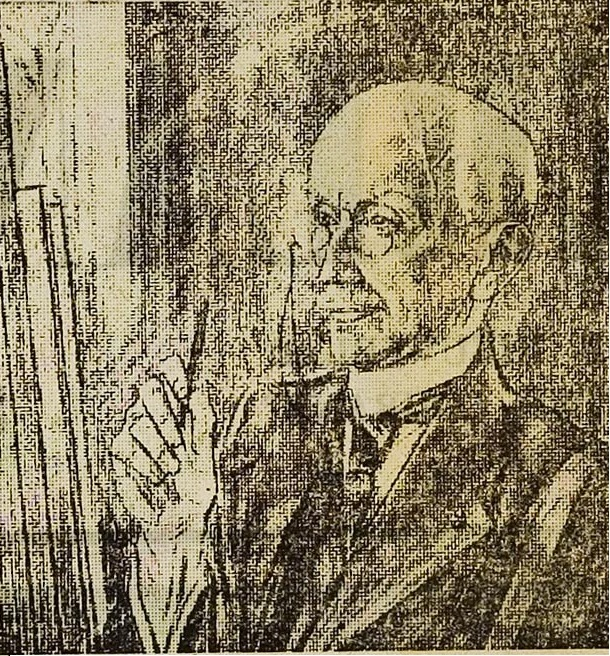
Carel Nicolaas Storm van 's-Gravesande; portrait by Jan Toorop

Carel Nicolaas Storm van 's Gravesande (21 January 1841, Breda - 7 February 1924, The Hague) was a Dutch painter, etcher and lithographer; associated with the Hague School. He is best known for seascapes, interior portraits and still lifes.

== Biography ==
He came from an aristocratic family. Although he expressed an early interest in art, his father insisted that he study law. He did so, at the University of Leiden, and graduated in 1865. Three years later, he defied his family's wishes and moved to Brussels, where he studied with Willem Roelofs, Paul Gabriël and Félicien Rops, who taught him etching and became a lifelong friend.

In 1893, he returned to the Netherlands and settled in The Hague, where he became a member of the Hague School, a group of artists who had been heavily influenced by the Barbizon School. He continued to travel, however, with stays in Paris, Wiesbaden (for two years), Cologne and Berlin. In 1900, he was awarded a gold medal at the Exposition Universelle.

He is credited with helping to create a renewal of interest in etching as an independent art form and produced more than 400 etchings; mostly landscapes and cityscapes. With Willem Witsen, he was a co-founder of the "Nederlandse Etsclub" (Dutch Etching Club). His works may be seen in museums around the world, including large institutions like the British Museum and the Detroit Institute of Arts and smaller museums such as the Owens Art Gallery in Sackville, New Brunswick. As a lithographer, he is believed to have been among the first to use aluminum plates, rather than stone or zinc.

== Selected works ==
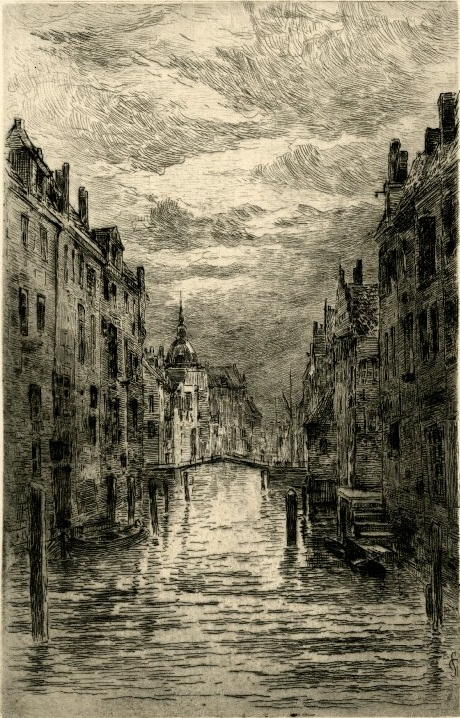
Canal in Dordrecht

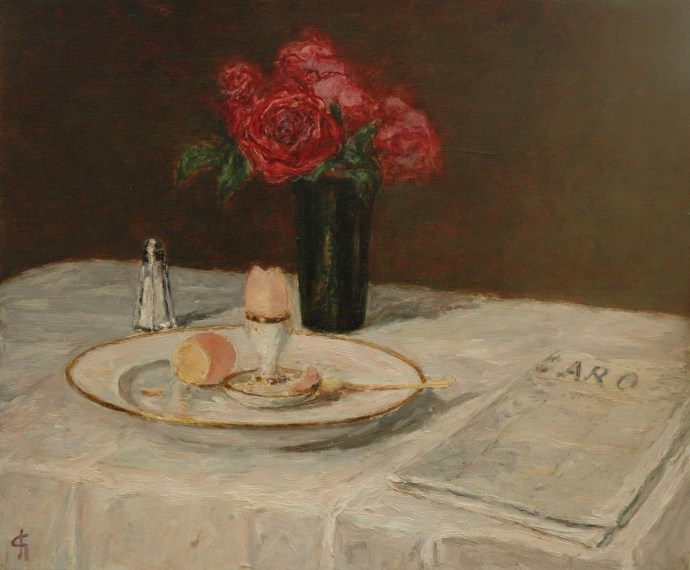
Breakfast

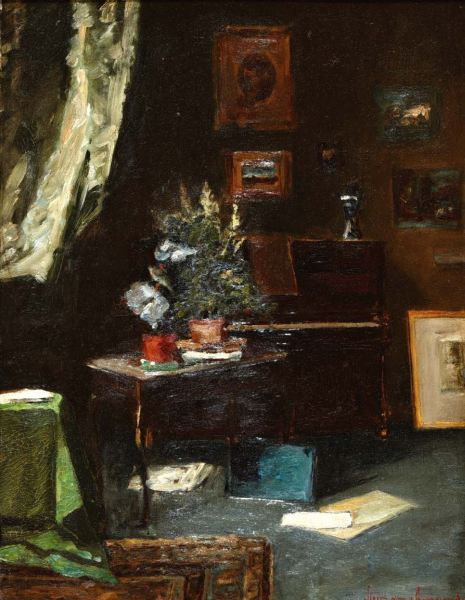
The Artist's Studio

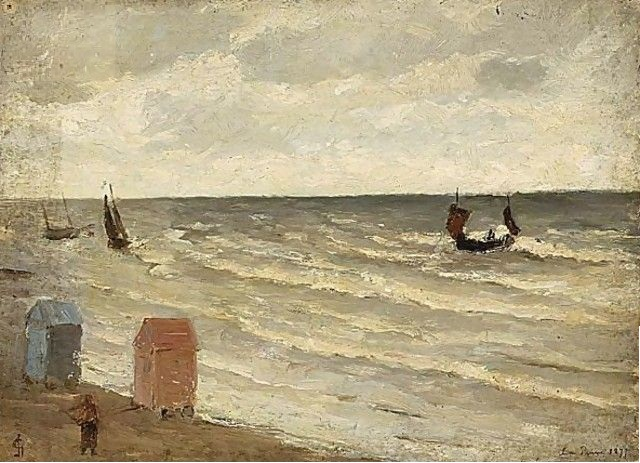
De Panne

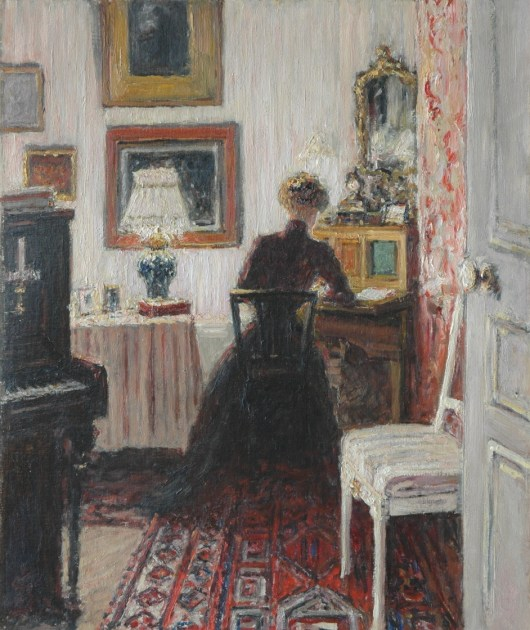
Lady in Parisian Interior
