= Thomas van der Noot =

Belgian author (1475 – 1525)

Thomas van der Noot (c. 1475 – c. 1525) was a publisher and author of the early 16th century, from a prominent family from Brussels. He was credited with publishing the earliest printed cookbook in the Dutch language, Een notabel boecxken van cokeryen (A Remarkable Book on Cooking), published around 1514.
