= Idared =

Apple cultivar

Malus domestica 'Idared'
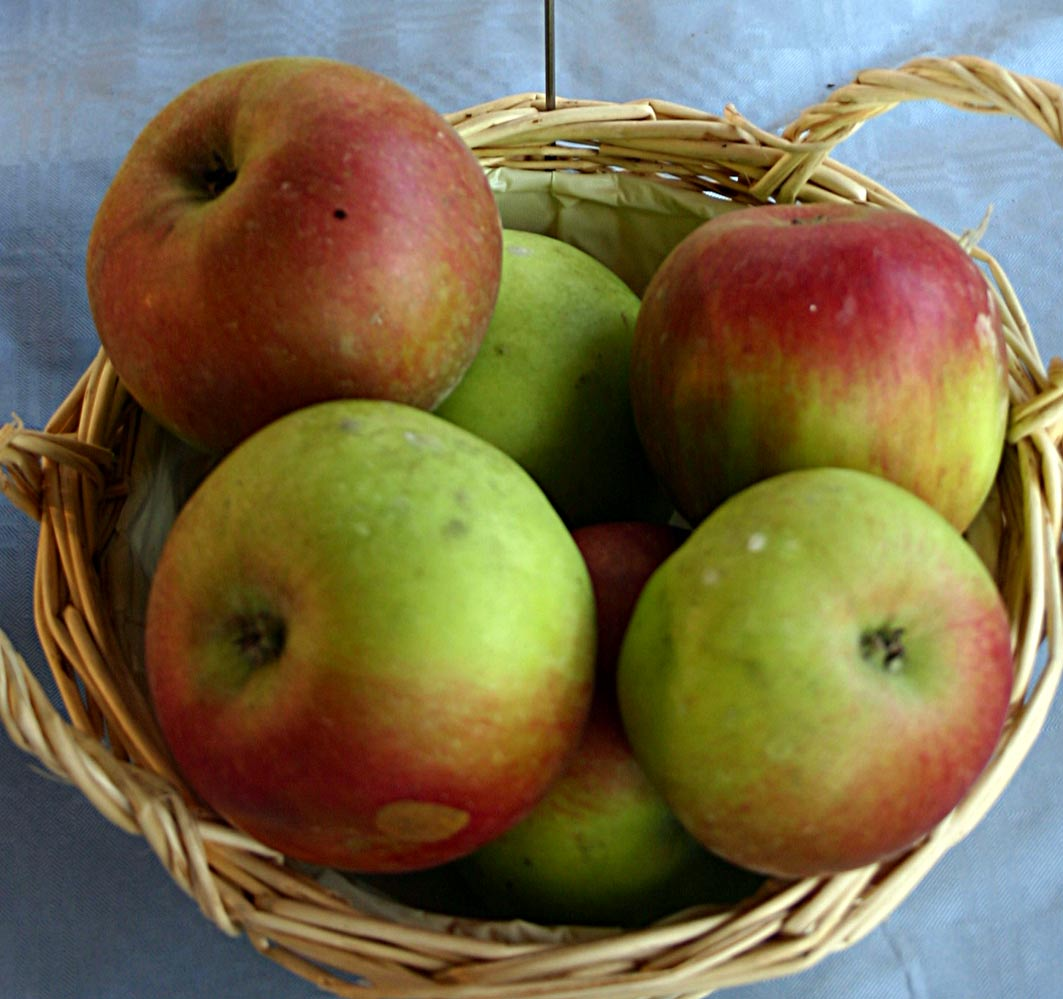
- Hybrid parentage: 'Jonathan' × 'Wagener'
- Cultivar: 'Idared'
- Origin: (United States) Idaho, 1942

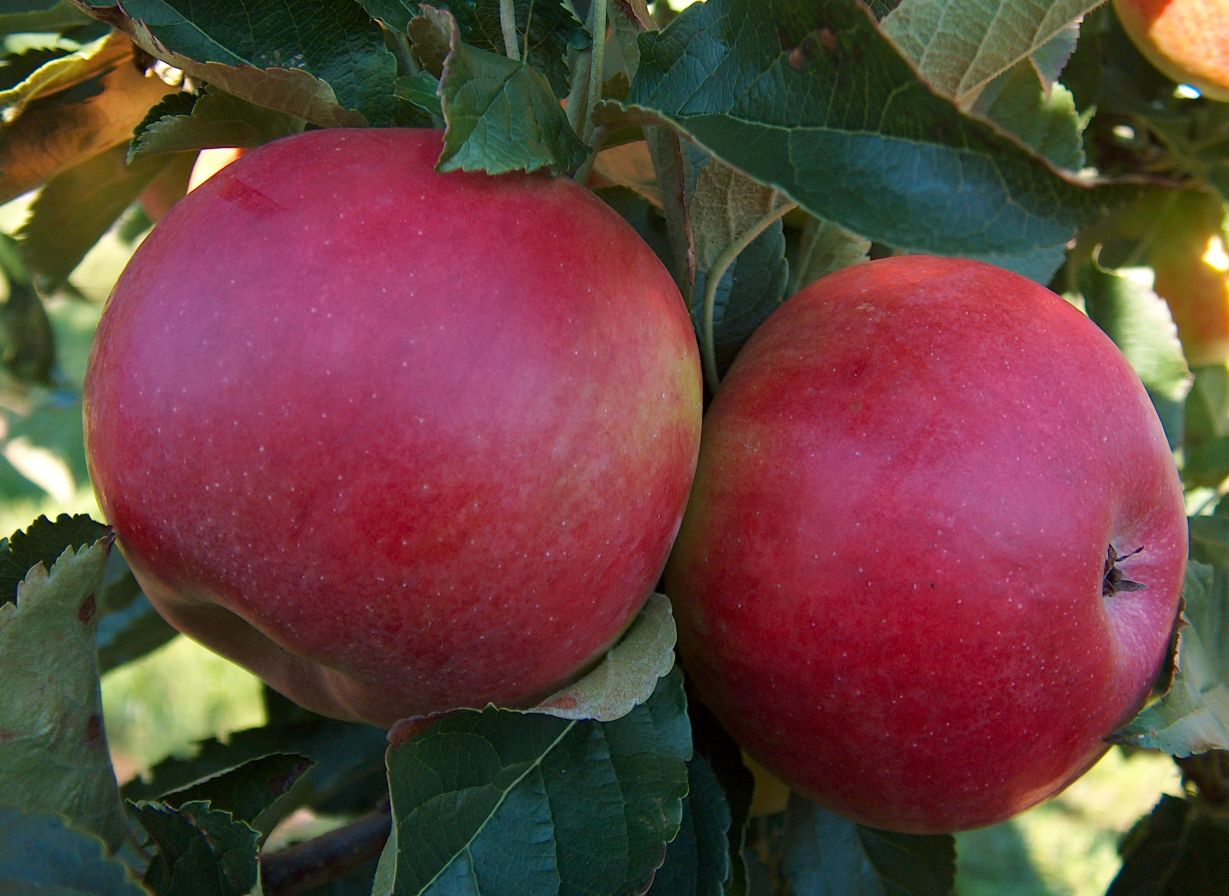
Idared apples in a tree

Idared is a type of apple cultivar from Moscow, Idaho, United States. Variety is characterized by a non-uniform skin color.

First developed at the University of Idaho Agricultural Experiment Station in 1942, it is a cross between two apple varieties (Jonathan × Wagener). The Idared has a white flesh with a firm body, and is tart and juicy. For these reasons, it is very well suited for making apple sauces, pies, and cakes. The Idared is harvested at the end of September to the middle of October. It remains hardy and durable until the end of January, and can even last until June with proper storage. According to the US Apple Association website, it is one of the fifteen most popular apple cultivars in the United States.

== Parentage ==
Descendants:

- Pia (Idared x Elios)
- Piflora (Idared x Golden Delicious)
- Pikosa (Pirella x Idared)
- Pilana (Pirella x Idared)
- Pingo (Idared x Bancroft)
- Pivita (Pirella x Idared)

== Disease susceptibility ==
- Scab: high
- Powdery mildew: high
- Cedar apple rust: high
- Fire blight: high
