= S. A. Beach =

American botanist (1860–1922)

Spencer Ambrose Beach (15 September 1860 – 1922), commonly known as S.A. Beach, was an American botanist. Beach served the head of the horticulture department at Iowa State University and was a founding member of the American Society for Horticultural Science.

== Biography ==
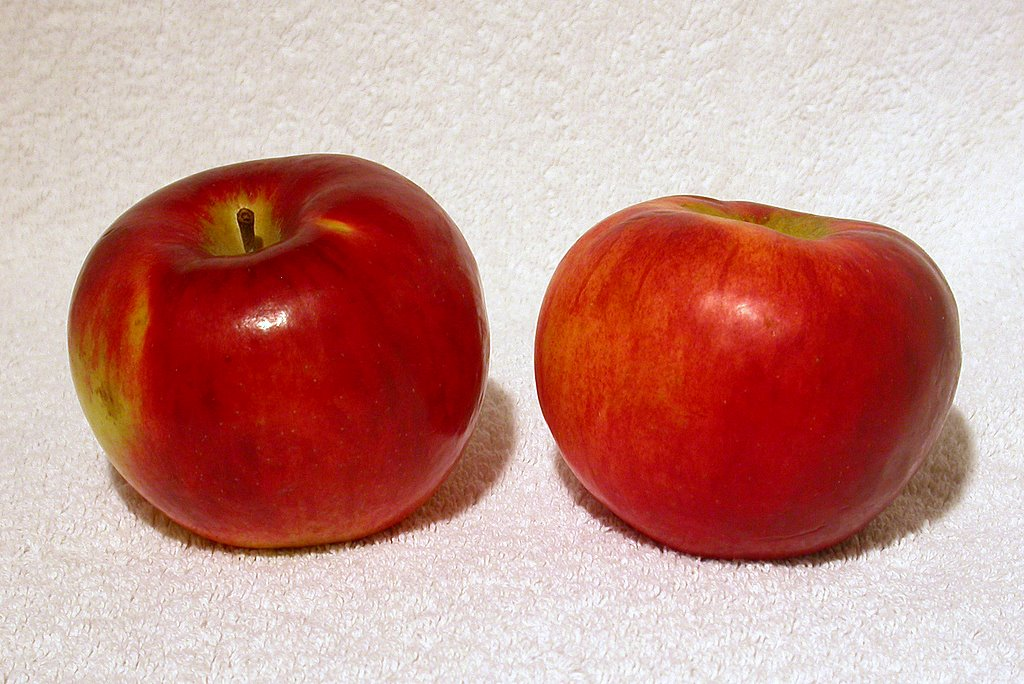
Cortland apples, which Beach is credited with crossbreeding.

Beach was born in 1860 in Sumnerhill, New York. He attended high-school in Ann-arbor before going on to teach in southern Iowa. He enrolled in Iowa State College in 1884 as part of the horticulture department. He earned his BS in 1887 and his MS in 1892.

In 1898 he joined an experimental horticultural program in Geneva, New York. While there he cross-bred Ben Davis and McIntosh apples and in doing so created the Cortland apple, which he declined to patent. Beach is also recognized as the first breeder to attempt to cross pollinate grapes.

The Royal Horticultural Society of London named Beach an honorary member in 1903, and that same year Beach became a founding member of the ASHS. In 1905 Beach returned from New York to become the head of the horticultural department at Iowa State.

Beach died in 1922.
