= Flamenco (apple) =

Apple cultivar

'Flamenco' apple
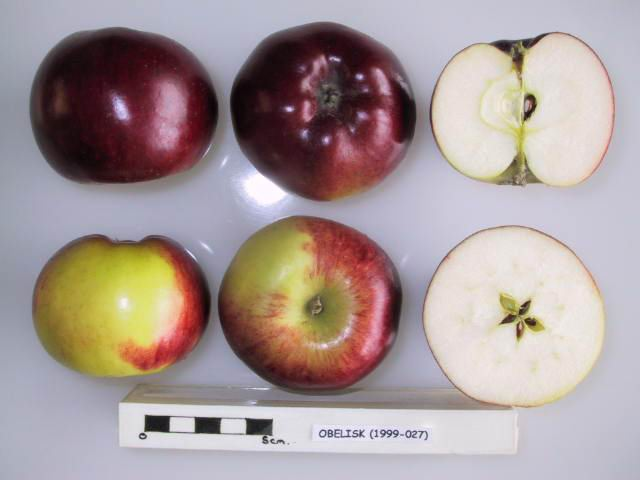
- Hybrid parentage: (Cox's Orange Pippin x Court Pendu Plat) × Wijcik McIntosh
- Cultivar: 'Flamenco' or 'Ballerina Obelisk'
- Origin: England, 1950 - 1999

Flamenco, also known as Ballerina Obelisk, is a cultivar of domesticated apple that bears apples good for eating fresh, and is grown for its unusual ornamental properties. The tree grows in a straight up columnar style, with many small fruit-bearing branches. 'Flamenco' is one of a series of apple tree cultivars that share a registered trademark under the name Ballerina.

Flamenco was developed in Kent, England, between 1950 and 1999 by the East Malling Research Station, when they crossed a hybrid of the English Cox's Orange Pippin and the French Court Pendu Plat with the "Wijcik McIntosh", which itself is a columnar mutation of the Canadian McIntosh apple.
