= Court Pendu Plat =

Apple cultivar

'Court Pendu Plat' apple
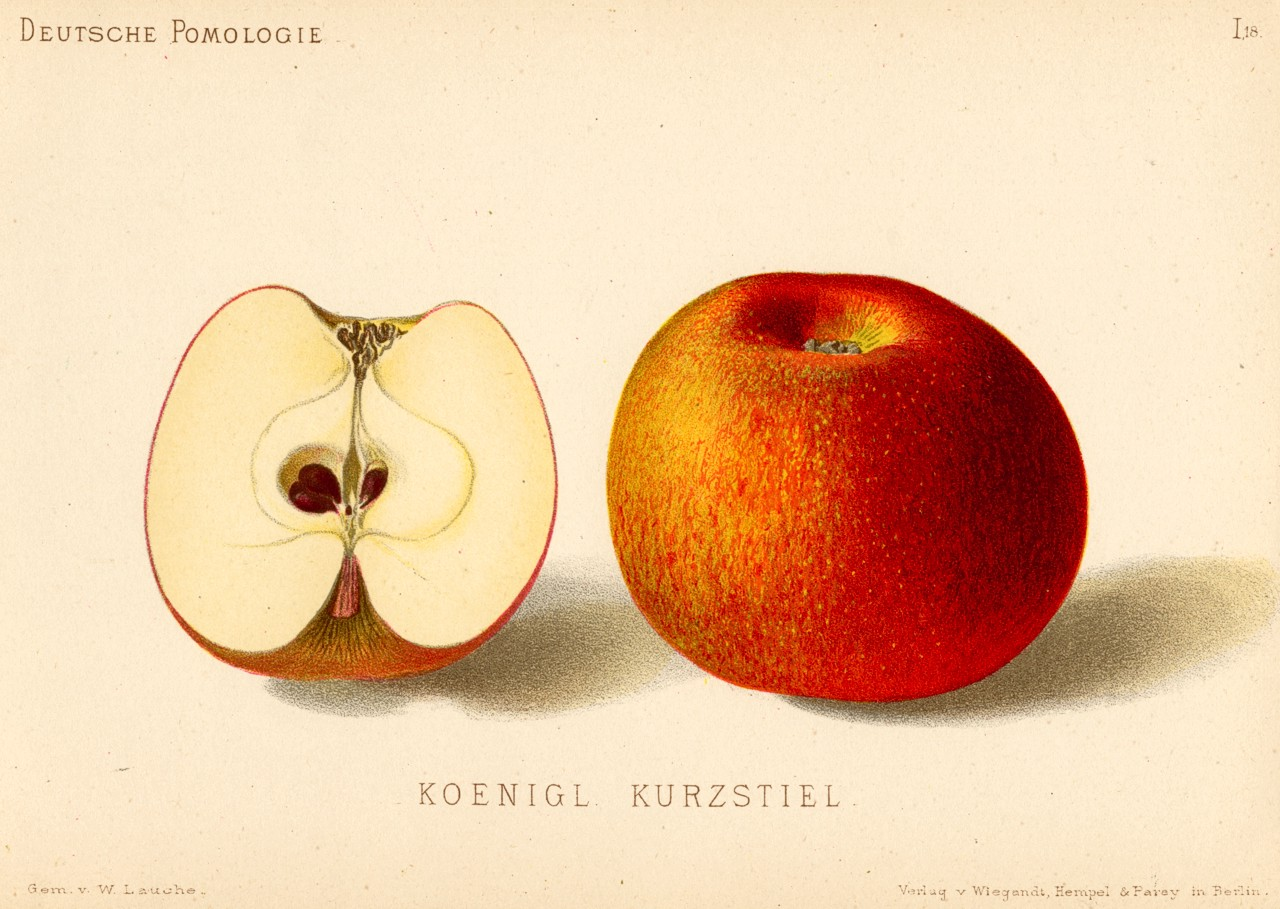
- Illustration of red-flushed 'Court Pendu' in 'Deutsche Pomologie', where it is called the "Koenigl Kurzstiel".
- Genus: Malus
- Species: Malus pumila
- Hybrid parentage: Old, unknown
- Cultivar: 'Court Pendu Plat'
- Origin: France, first described in 1613

Court Pendu Plat is an extremely old French cultivar of domesticated apple that was first recorded in 1613. The cultivar definitely dates back to earlier than the 17th century, and it is thought that it may have been cultivated by the Romans. It is known for its intense flavor which mellows with storage.

== Names ==
The apple's name is derived from corps pendu in French, which refers to the short stalk of the fruit. This also matches with its German name "Kurzstiel" or how it is named in Deutsche Pomologie "Koeniglicher Kurzstiel", meaning the royal short stalk. It is also called the "Wise Apple" because of its late flowering, which avoids the risk of blossom damage due to frost.

== Description ==
'Court Pendu Plat' has a unique texture which is dense but not crisp, similar to cheddar cheese, so it is recommended to cut it with a knife and not bite in while whole. The skin is greenish yellow and flushed with red, and is often russeted. The fruit's shape is extremely flattened. It is mainly eaten fresh, but can also be used in cooking. The apple is rather dry and not very juicy.

The Court Pendu Plat tree is a spur-bearer with attractive flowers. It has a good resistance to general apple diseases, especially to scab and to mildew, as well as a resistance to frost. The apple is harvested late, usually in October.

== Descendants ==
'Court Pendu Plat' is a direct progenitor of the 'Suntan' apple and a more distant ancestor for the 'Flamenco' apple. It may also be an ancestor of the very popular English 'Cox's Orange Pippin', since it shares its intense flavor, flattened shape, coloring and shading.
