= Suntan =

Suntan may refer to:

- Sun tanning
- Suntan (apple), a cultivar
- Lockheed CL-400 Suntan, a concept aircraft
- Suntan (1976 film), a Bollywood drama film
- Suntan (2016 film), a Greek drama film
- Project Suntan, a NASA project involving liquid nitrogen research
