= Melba (apple) =

Apple cultivar

'Melba apple'
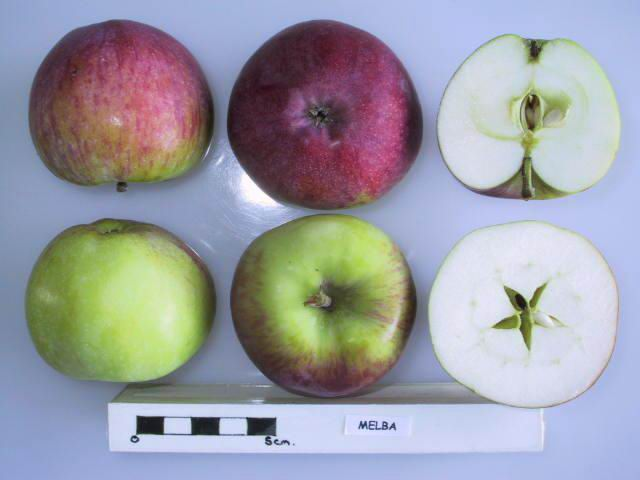
- Genus: Malus
- Species: M. domestica
- Hybrid parentage: McIntosh x Liveland Raspberry apple
- Cultivar: 'Melba'
- Origin: Ontario, Canada

Melba is a Canadian cultivar of domesticated apple, which was developed by W. T. Macoun at the Central Experimental Farm, in Ottawa, Ontario by crossing a McIntosh with a Liveland Raspberry apple. It has a yellow skin washed with crimson colour. Flesh is extremely white, firm and crisp. Flavor is sweet with hints of tart. There is also a Red Melba (a.k.a. Melred) mutation which is more red coloured, flesh firmer, and is ripening a few days later in season.

This tree is very productive and can bear fruit at a young age, but has a biennial tendency and early harvest. Need high skill gardening but highly rewarded. It is mainly used for fresh eating.

== Gallery ==
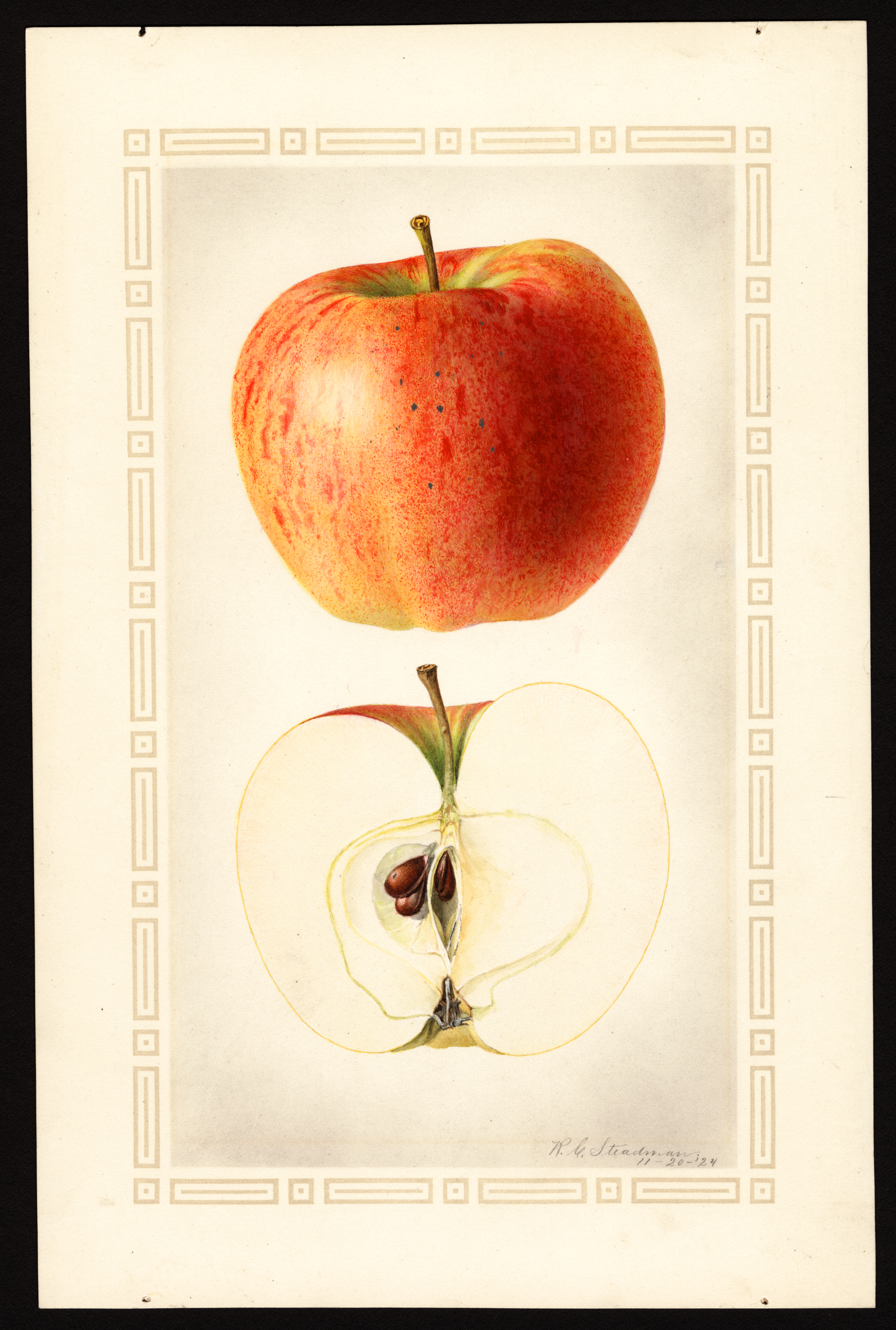
US Department of Agriculture watercolor

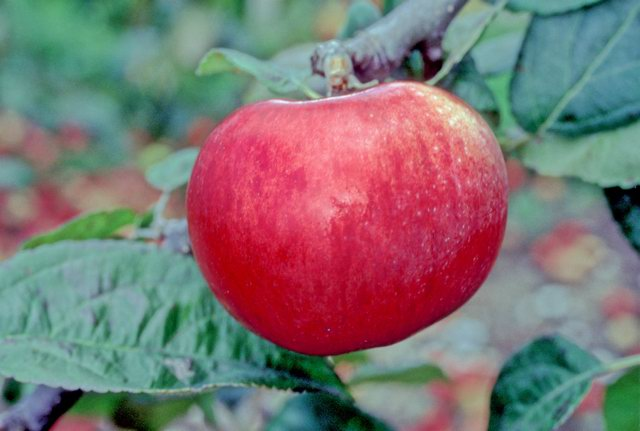
Melba growing on tree
