= Parrott Hall =

Historic house in New York, United States

- U.S. National Register of Historic Places
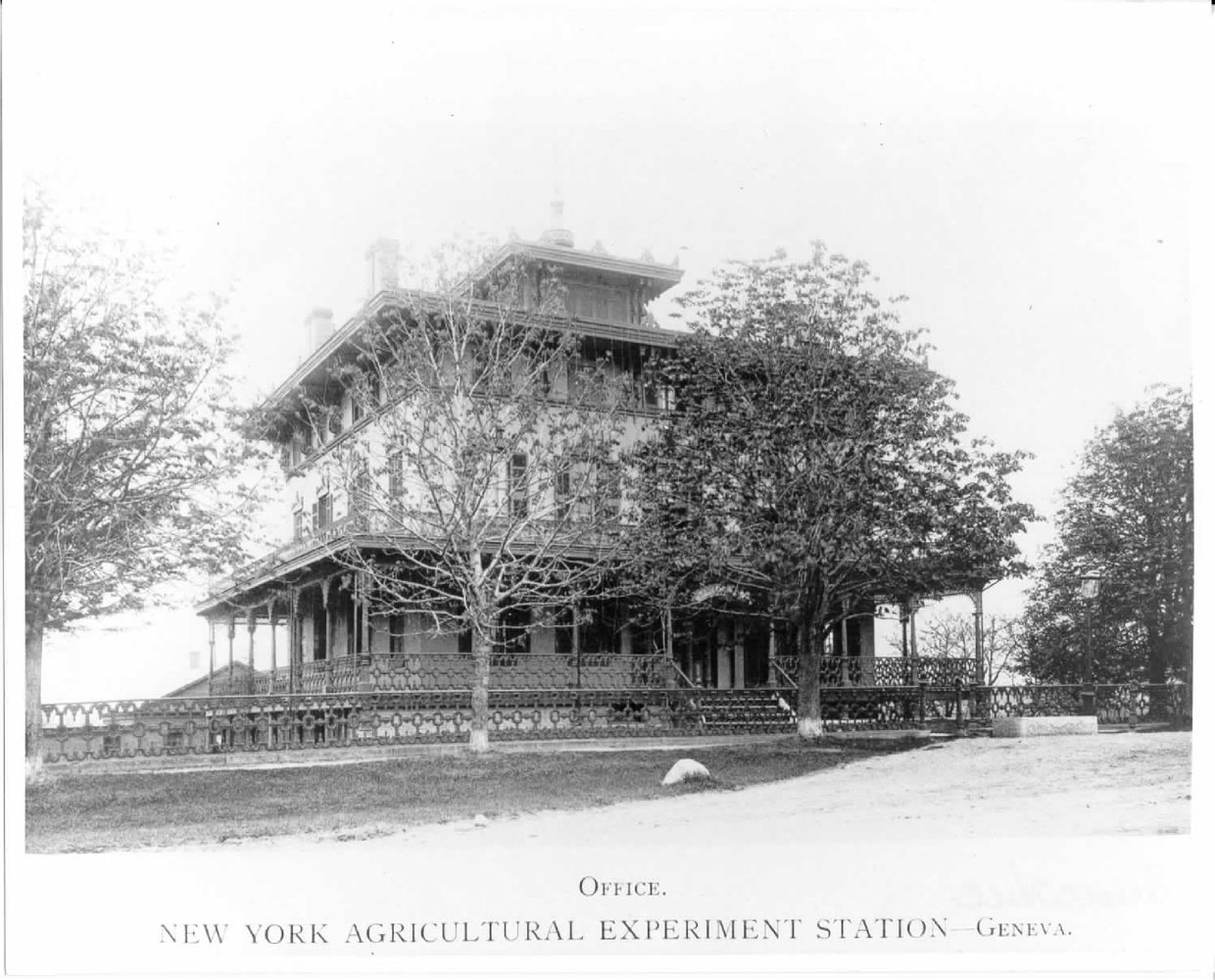

- Location within New York Location within the United States
- Location: W. North St. between Castle St. and Preemption Rd., Geneva, New York
- Coordinates: 42°52′36″N 77°0′30″W
- Area: less than one acre
- Built: early 1850s
- Architectural style: Italianate Villa
- NRHP reference No.: 71000553
- Added to NRHP: August 12, 1971

Parrott Hall (formerly known as Denton House, Denton Place and Entomology Hall) is a historic home located at Geneva in Ontario County, New York. It was built in the early 1850s and consists of a 3-story main block and 2-story addition in the Italianate villa style. In 1882, the property was acquired by New York State for use as an agricultural experiment station, and was part of the New York State Agricultural Experiment Station until 1968. It was deeded to the New York State Office of Parks, Recreation and Historic Preservation in 1970 for use as a museum.

It was listed on the National Register of Historic Places in 1971.

== History ==
Wealthy agriculturists Nehemiah (also known as William) and Louisa (also known as Louise) Denton moved from New York City to Geneva in 1852, at a time when the area was the center of agricultural prosperity in New York. They purchased the land then known as the Old Castle Farm in the early 1850s, commissioned the building of the Italiante villa now known as Parrott Hall, and moved into the new mansion in 1856. Both Nehemiah and Louisa were deaf mutes.

In 1882, Nehemiah was considered to be of "unsound mind" and, in order to settle his debts, he sold the dwelling, outbuildings, and 125 acres. The property was purchased for $25,000 by the State of New York to become an agricultural experiment station. The villa, then known as Denton Place or Denton House, was converted into the headquarters of what would become the New York State Agricultural Experiment Station at Geneva, colloquially known as the Geneva Experiment Station.

In the early 1900s, the building housed the laboratory and offices of the Station's first entomologist, Percival John Parrott, during which time it became known as Entomology Hall. Parrott was known for his efforts to combat San Jose scale, an introduced insect that was severely damaging fruit crops in the early 20th century. He was appointed the station's director in 1938 and served until 1942, the year he retired. The building was renamed Parrott Hall in his honor.

Parrott Hall was used by the State from 1882 until 1968, when it was replaced by Barton Hall. To bring recognition to its historic significance, members of the Geneva Historic Society led an effort to nominate it to the National Register of Historic Places. in 1970. It was listed the following year. In recognition of its historic significance, the New York State Office of Parks, Recreation and Historic Preservation (OPRHP) took title to the property with the intent to rehabilitate it for use as a museum. Repairs and maintenance were performed by OPRHP from the time the building was vacated by the Station in 1968 until 1983, after which time no substantial maintenance was undertaken. It has been vacant since 1968.

Local preservation advocates formed the non-profit Friends of Parrott Hall in 2017. In the summer of 2018, OPRHP solicited bids for demolition. Spurred by the building's imminent demise, the Friends of Parrott Hall formed a coalition with The Landmark Society of Western New York, the Preservation League of New York State, and the City of Geneva to save the building from imminent demolition. Due in part to the coalition's efforts, OPRHP determined that demolition would be "delayed indefinitely", with the caveat that the coalition raise funds to stabilize the building and provide a plan for its reuse.

As of the winter of 2018, the coalition was working with OPRHP to raise funds for stabilization and to formulate a plan for its reuse.

The Geneva Experiment Station has made important contributions to the history of botany in New York State, including pioneering advances in carpology, agriculture, horticulture, plant pathology, and dairy production. Studies conducted at the Station aided the development of nurseries in nearby Ontario and Monroe counties and in vineyards across New York State.

== Structure ==
The structure is an Italianate villa consisting of a three-story hipped roof main block and two story gable roof wing addition to the rear. Its design is based on a plan from the Model Architect, a pattern book written by architect Samuel Sloan in 1853. The Denton's followed Sloan's design closely, making only minor modifications to the front entrance and the belvedere, which has since been removed. In addition to removing the belvedere, the Station made many other interior modifications to suit changing needs.

The Hall has an L-shaped layout, with the rear wing extending south from the central block. The main block has a center hall plan. Though there were originally four chimneys, the current building has only three—two on the east facade of the central block, one on the west wall. Window cornices and sills are of cast iron.

The structure has an ornate veranda, consisting of cast iron columns, railing, and parapet extending around the perimeter, except for one section at the southeast corner. The nomination to the National Register of Historic Places notes that Parrott Hall is "an outstanding example of the Italianate villa style popular in the mid-nineteenth century. The ornate cast-iron veranda is especially notable."

At the time of the NRHP nomination in 1970, the building was covered with the historic standing seam metal roof. In the mid-1970s, the State removed the standing seam metal roof from the main block and replaced it with rolled roofing, rebuilt the three remaining chimneys, and sandblasted and painted the wrought-iron railing, frieze of the verandah, and columns. The building exterior was repainted in 1983.

In the early 1980s, Parrott Hall was the focus of a master's thesis by a Cornell graduate student which concluded that the structural condition was "impressive, given the age of the building and its many years of heavy use" and that the structure had not suffered "too badly" in the years since 1971, when it was disconnected from steam and electricity. However, the report noted that there were telltale signs of moisture-related problems including periodic basement ponding and damage to the verandah due to the lack of gutters.

In the late 1990s, a thesis report by a graduate student in the Historic Preservation Program at the University of Vermont determined that the interior had recently suffered damage due to water infiltration. The report was published to "assist the Station with its efforts to stabilize Parrott Hall until such time as money is available for restoration." It was determined that the water damage was due to the roof's deteriorated state, and that roofing, gutters, and downspouts needed to be installed or replaced.
