= Jersey Black =

Apple cultivar

Malus domestica 'Jersey Black'
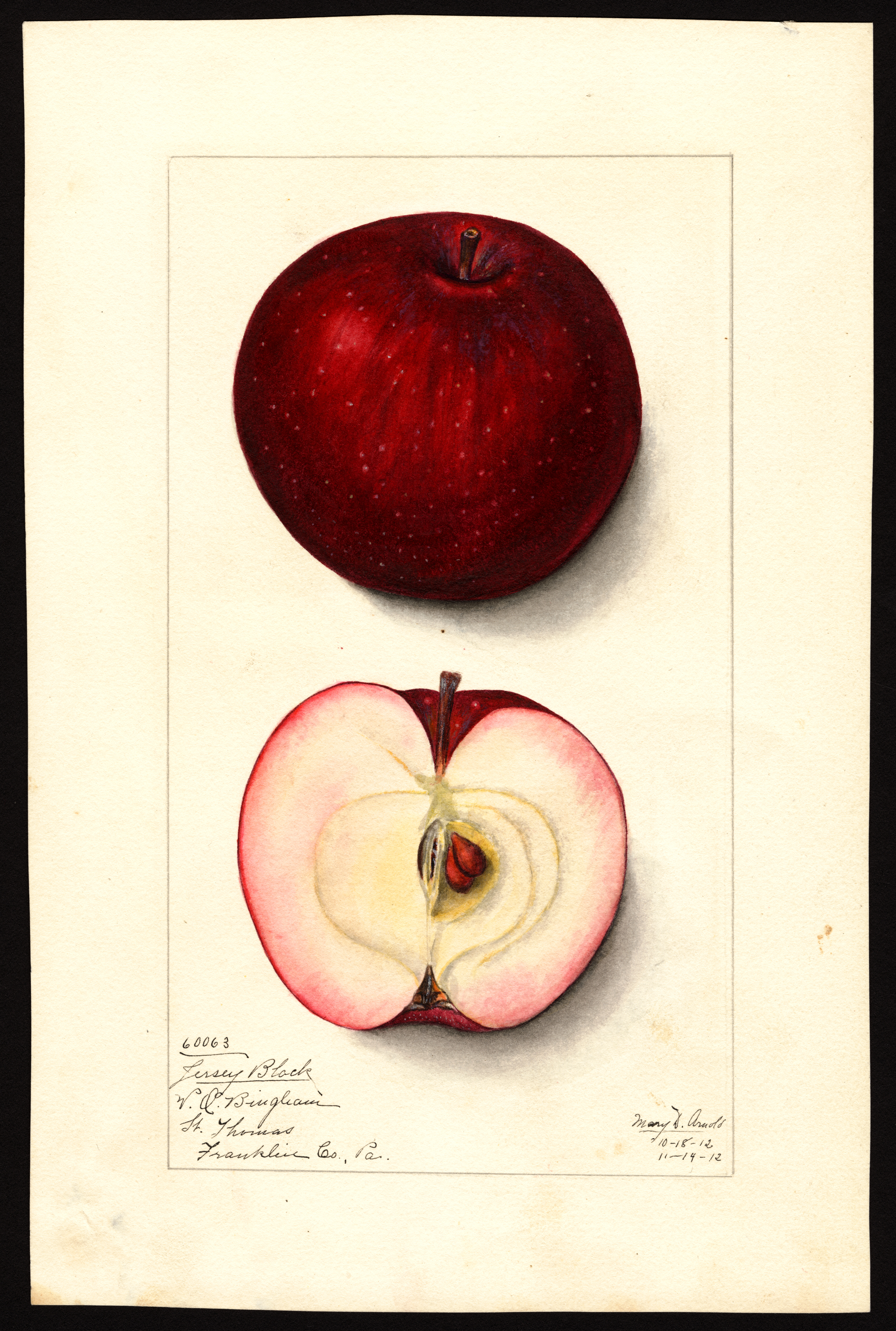
- Cultivar: 'Jersey Black'

The Jersey Black apple is an old North American variety of apple, or Malus domestica; it is thought to have originated c. 1817, but has fallen somewhat out of favor. It is also known as the Black Apple because its skin is very dark red, appearing almost black. It is a dessert apple with sweet white firm flesh. It was once used for the production of cider. This variety is notable for a cross with a McIntosh red to produce the Macoun.
