= New York State Agricultural Experiment Station =

US research station

Coordinates: 42°52′33″N 77°00′28″W

The New York State Agricultural Experiment Station (NYSAES) at Geneva, Ontario County, New York State, is an agricultural experiment station operated by the New York State College of Agriculture and Life Sciences at Cornell University. In August 2018, the station was branded as Cornell AgriTech, although its official name remains unchanged.

== History ==
=== 19th century ===
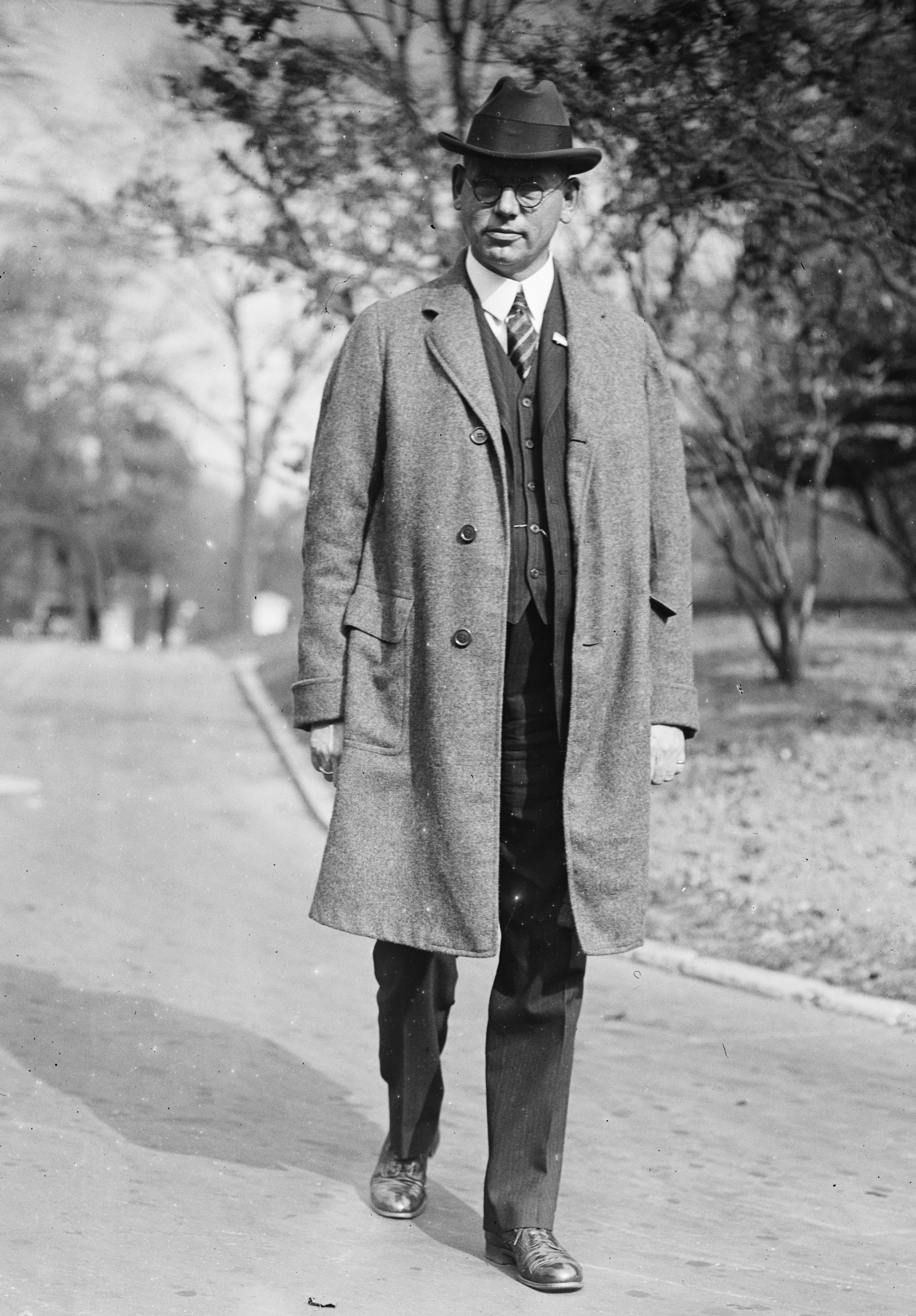
Roscoe Wilfred Thatcher, the station director during the 1920s

The New York State Agricultural Experiment Station was established by an Act of the New York State Legislature on June 26, 1880. More than 100 locations were considered, but a 125-acre parcel in Geneva was eventually chosen. In 1882, the State purchased the land, an Italianate villa, and all outbuildings from Nehemiah and Louisa Denton for $25,000. The villa was converted into the Station headquarters, now known as Parrott Hall. The new institution became operative on March 1, 1882. It would become known colloquially as the Geneva Experiment Station.

An 1883 Report of the Board of Control of the NYSAES to the New York State Assembly stated that there were immediate and dire threats state agricultural output caused by insect pests, bovine diseases, drought, soil nutrient exhaustion, and outward labor migration, and that an organization dedicated to staving off these threats was needed.

Originally, farmers wanted the station to serve as a model farm. However, the first director, E. Lewis Sturtevant, immediately established the policy that the station was to conduct agricultural science research and to establish experimental plots, both of which would have little resemblance to commercial agriculture. Nevertheless, the primary mission of the Station has always been to serve those who produce and consume New York's agricultural products.

In its early days, Station scientists, who were few in number, concentrated their efforts on dairy, horticulture, and evaluation of varieties of vegetables and field crops. In 1887, the program was broadened to include work on beef cattle, swine, and evaluation of fruit varieties. During this period, the station also began playing its continuing active role in the state's agricultural law enforcement program. Still later, research activities were added in the fields of bacteriology, dairy science, fruit horticulture, chemistry, plant pathology, and insect and mite species.

=== 20th century ===
At the beginning of the 20th century, a fundamental philosophy was developed regarding activities of the station that is still, basically, in effect today. This philosophy stated that research done at the station should be conducted on principles underlying agricultural practices and, further, that agricultural research should be the full-time responsibility of the staff without it having to also play a teaching role. This was a marked departure from the role played by staff at other agricultural experiment stations throughout the country.

Originally an independent unit of the state, the Station became part of Cornell University in 1923. Research was expanded to include studies on canning crops, nursery plants, and disease and insect pests of rubes. At the end of World War II, all animal research was moved to the Ithaca campus of Cornell University and the Geneva Station became a true horticultural research institute. Since then, it has been the center for research in New York on the production, protection, and utilization of fruit and vegetable crops, an industry that is today valued in excess of $2 billion.

== Campus ==
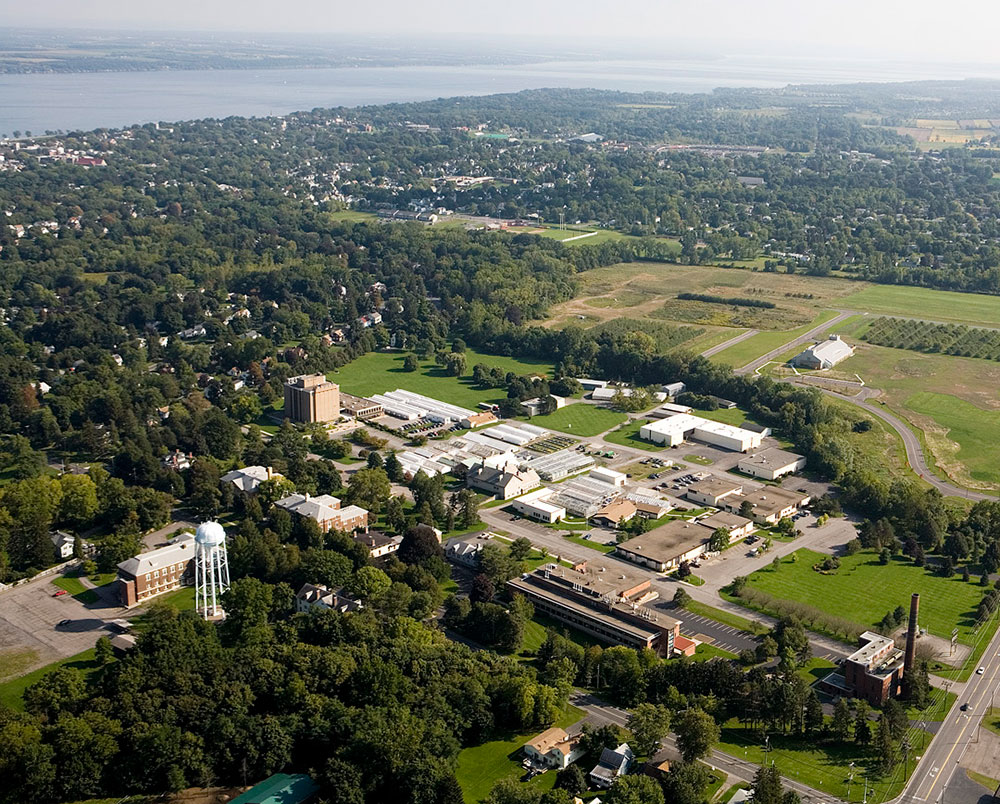
An aerial photo of the New York State Agricultural Experiment Station in 2006

The station has expanded from the original 125 acres, mansion and outbuildings to an 850-acre complex containing more than 20 major buildings. There are 700 acres are devoted to test plots, orchards, and vineyards, and 65,000 square feet of greenhouse space. New York State funded a $6.7 million construction project to renovate the Food Science Laboratory in 2007, with work completed by 2009.

The U.S. Department of Agriculture's Plant Genetic Resources Unit, which collects and does research on seeds for food plants, is also located on the Geneva campus.

The station has three outlying substations: the Hudson Valley Laboratory in Highland, the Cornell Lake Erie Research & Extension Laboratory in Portland, and the Uihlein Maple Research Forest in Lake Placid.

== Research and publications ==
Although an experiment station with a strong emphasis on applied research, the station also maintains a balance of basic research to serve as a foundation for future research applicable to New York agriculture. As of 2006, there were 350 employees working on approximately 230 different projects. Of those employees, 56 were professors.

Shortly after Station opened, Emmet S. Goff (1853–1902) became its first horticulturalist. His work on apple varieties, begun in 1883, produced a collection of research on apples and crabapples that was, at the time, the "most noteworthy collection of its kind", containing over 700 named varieties of apples and crabapples. Apple breeding efforts at the Station have led to the development of the Cortland, Empire, Jonagold, Jonamac and Macoun apples.

From 1900 to 1925, the Station published a series of seven monographs on hardy fruits that were well adapted to northern climes as part of their annual report. The publications began with the two-volume Apples of New York, a 1905 report written by Station horticulturalist Spencer Ambrose Beach. The series was continued by Ulysses Prentiss Hedrick, who released six volumes on grapes, plums, cherries, peaches, pears and small fruits over a period of eighteen years. The Station's series on the fruits of New York was, and remains today, a highly respected publication. A circular released July 1932 to commemorate Station's fiftieth year noted the "exhaustive monographs on the hardy fruits" and stated that the texts were, by that time, "accepted universally as standard treatises on the subject." The Fruits of New York series was the highlight of a 2018 exhibition by the New York State Library.

In 2006, the Station developed three new wine grapes: 'Noiret', 'Corot noir' and 'Valvin Muscat'

Cornell's School of Integrative Plant Science contains the only horticulture program offered in any Ivy League school.

Uihlein Maple Research Forest, located in Lake Placid, New York, is operated by Cornell University as a part of its maple and forest research initiatives. The field station is primarily dedicated to research on sugar maple physiology, climate change, and sustainable forestry. Studies conducted at Uihlein contribute to statewide efforts to improve maple syrup production and sustainability practices, further informing policy recommendations for New York's agricultural sector. Findings from the forest's work on freeze-thaw cycle sensitivity, forest health monitoring, and tapping guidelines have been incorporated into training programs and "best-practice" recommendations for maple producers across. Thus, the facility not only serves as a leading environmental research center, but additionally as a connection between researchers at Cornell and New York policymakers, foresters, and farmers.

== Operations ==
Prior to the early 2000s, most of the money for agricultural research at the Station was provided by state and federal governments. The Station's 2007–2008 total budget was approximately $25.1 million; $11.8 million funded through the State University of New York base budget, $6.4 million from Cornell general purpose funds, $5.5 million in grants and contracts, and $1.1 million in Federal appropriations. As the station's research program has matured and expanded, the financial support base has been increasingly augmented by funds from foundations, industry, grower and food processor organizations, and by individuals.
