= Paula Red =

Apple cultivar

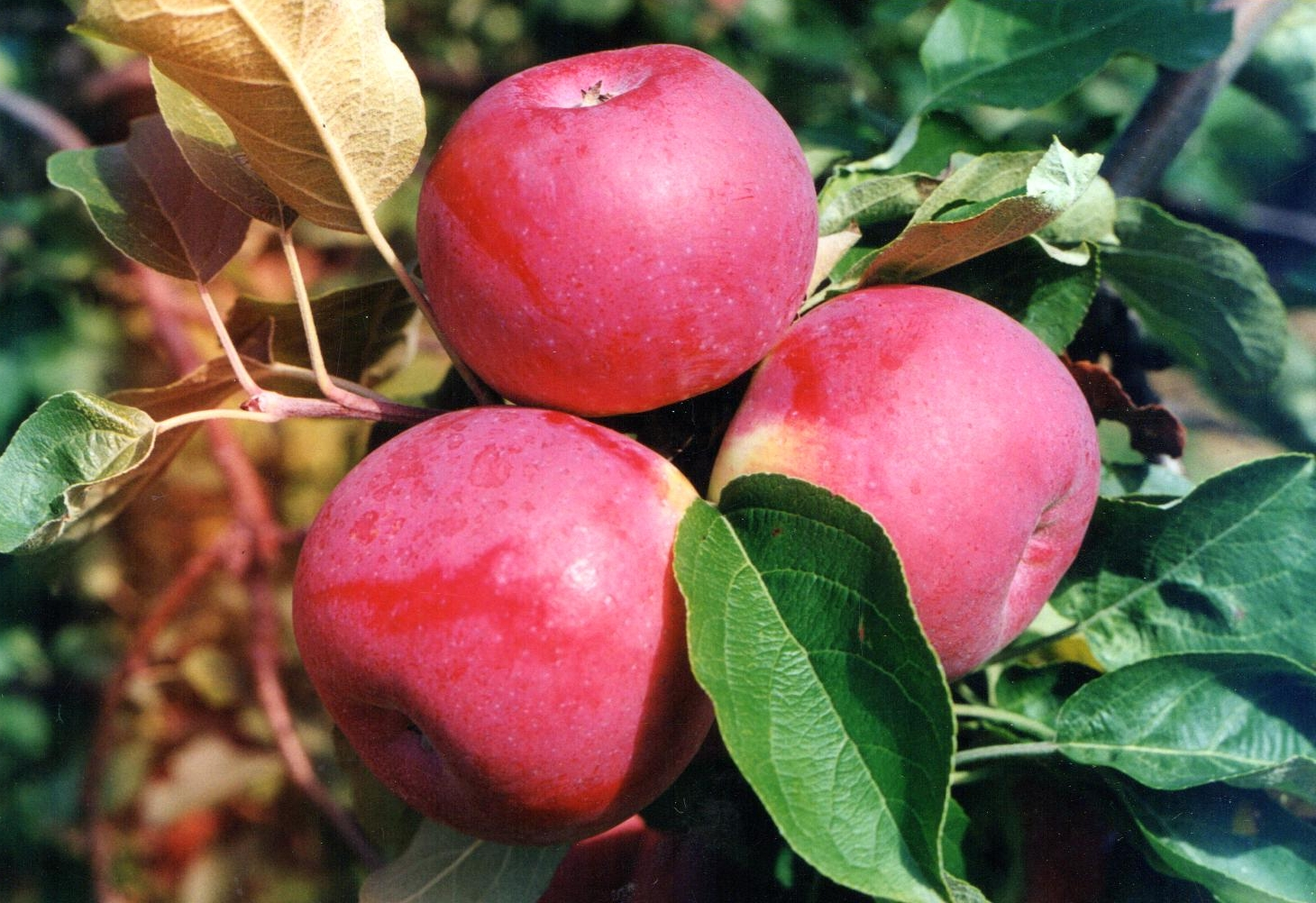
- Species: Malus domestica
- Hybrid parentage: Duchess × McIntosh (chance seedling)
- Cultivar: Paula Red
- Origin: (United States) Sparta Township, Michigan, 1960

Paula Red (or Paulared) is a cultivated variety or cultivar of apple originally from Michigan, United States. Tests run by experts show its parents to be McIntosh and Duchess. Paulareds mature after Duchess and before McIntosh.

== Appearance and flavor ==
Paulared apples are bright red with some yellow and tan spots; the skin often has a dusty sheen. They have a sprightly taste, not too sweet and not too tart, vinous and slightly reminiscent of strawberries. It has a firm white flesh that becomes soft and mealy extremely quickly as its season declines. Paula Red apples are suitable for both eating fresh and cooking, although they become extremely soft when cooked, which suits them to some dishes (applesauce) and not others (pies).

== History ==
The first Paula Red apple tree was discovered in 1960 by grower Lewis Arends near a McIntosh block in his orchard in Sparta Township, Kent County, Michigan. He named the apple after his wife, Pauline. Paulared apples appeared on the market in 1968.

== Season ==
The Paula Red apple is available from late August into October. It ripens with, and is often mistaken for, Tydeman's Early Worcester, another McIntosh descendant. In the Northern United States, it is among the earliest apples to be harvested.
