= Wijcik McIntosh =

Apple cultivar

'Wijcik McIntosh'
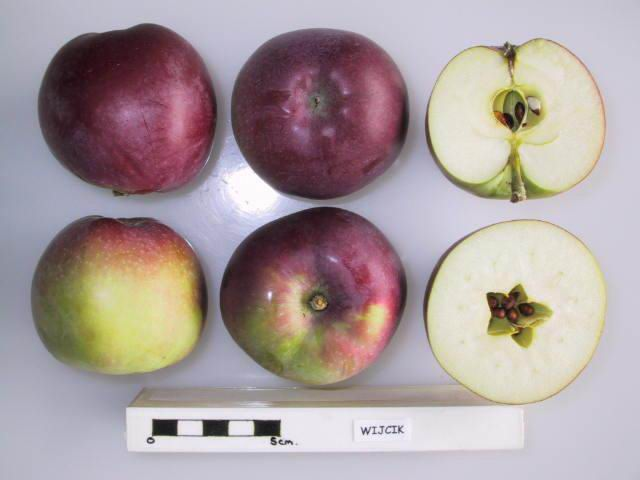
- Hybrid parentage: Mutation of McIntosh
- Cultivar: 'Wijcik McIntosh'
- Origin: mid-1960s

Wijcik McIntosh is a mutation of the McIntosh apple that has a columnar growing habit, meaning that it grows straight and upright, and is spur-bearing, without any major branching. This property is very much appreciated for use as an ornamental plant for itself, and also in the breeding of other apple cultivars, to make them columnar as well.

This mutant was first discovered in the mid 1960s by Anthony Wijcik in Kelowna, British Columbia. His daughter Wendy pointed out the mutated branch on a fifty-year-old standard McIntosh tree. The mutation that causes the extreme spur-type growth is governed by the compact (Co) gene. This gene is highly heritable and around 40% of crosses that involve the Wijcik plant are also columnar.

It was initially developed by Don Fisher of the Summerland Research Station in British Columbia, Canada. Then rights were sold to Stark Brothers Nursery who applied for a patent (U.S. Plant Pat. No. 4,382) in 1978 and were later granted it in 1979.

It was the first "columnar style" ornamental apple trees. Over 300 crosses were made from this single McIntosh Wijcik tree, by various apple breeding programs throughout the world, in order to develop more columnar apple cultivars. Some examples of varieties that have Wijcik Mcintosh in their parentage are Telamon, Tuscan, Trajan, Golden Sentinel and Scarlett Sentinel.

== See also ==
- Flamenco (apple)
- Fruit tree pruning
