= Empire (apple) =

Apple cultivar

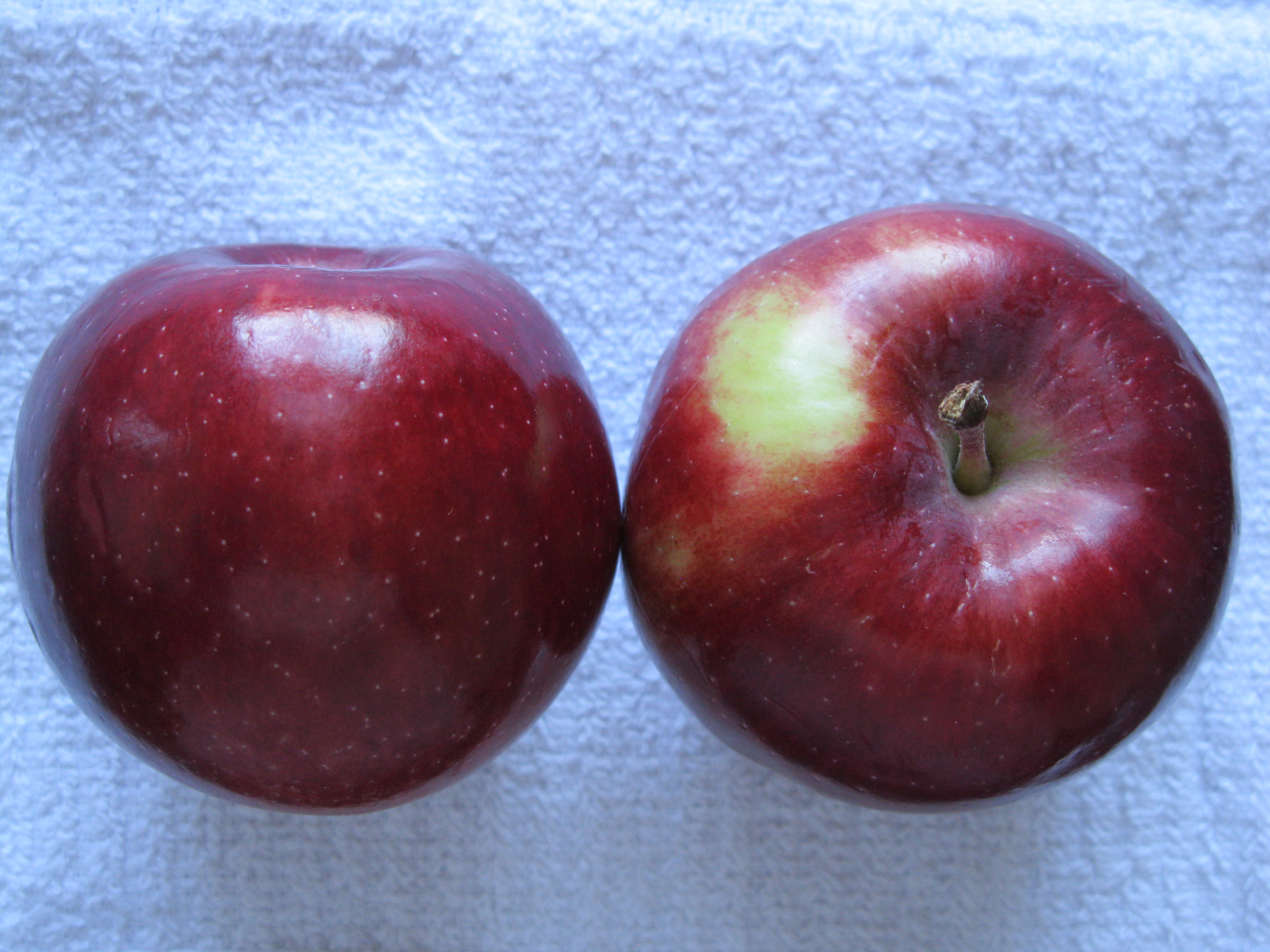
- Species: Malus domestica
- Hybrid parentage: McIntosh × Red Delicious
- Cultivar: NY 45500-5
- Marketing names: Empire
- Breeder: Lester C. Anderson
- Origin: (United States) Geneva, New York, 1945

Empire is a clonally propagated cultivar of apple derived from a seed sown in 1945 by Lester C. Anderson, a Cornell University fruit nutritionist who conducted open pollination research on his various orchards. Pomologist and apple breeder Roger Way named this new variety the Empire after its home state, New York (the "Empire State"). This variety is mostly grown in the Northeastern United States.

== Description ==
Empire apples are harvested in late fall, after the McIntosh and before the Red Delicious. Though not as easy to grow as the McIntosh, the Empire is a low-maintenance and high-yield variety. Pre-harvest drop rarely occurs. Pollinating partners of the Empire include the Cortland, Fuji, and Jonathan.

The original seed was a cross between the McIntosh and Red Delicious varieties, both highly popular at the time. The Empire apple is round and is of medium size when the tree is thinned. Its white flesh is covered by waxy, tough, chewy, crimson and yellow-green skin, which becomes dark red on the side exposed to sunlight. In terms of taste and texture, the Empire is comparable to the RubyFrost. It is crisp, sweet, tart, vinous, juicy, and is slower to brown than most, making it excellent for snacking and salads, and good for sauce, baking, pies, freezing, candies, and savory dishes. Being resistant to bruising, Empire apples are also suitable for lunch boxes. In controlled-atmosphere storage, the Empire can last for up to ten months. During the early twenty-first century, the Empire saw growing popularity for making apple cider. The Royal Empire, a mutant or sport of the Empire, can be planted further to the south than other McIntosh offspring.

The Empire and Honeycrisp are the parents of the Orleans, a variety from Quebec.

== History and cultivation ==
In 1945, under the direction of A. J. Heinicke, scientists from the New York State Agricultural Experiment Station of Cornell University in Geneva, New York, harvested the Empire seed together with thousands of its siblings. Breeders sought to create a new variety that was disease-resistant and had the flavor of the McIntosh and the sweetness of the Red Delicious. Over four thousand seeds were extracted and sent to Geneva for planting. The Geneva teams grew and tested ever dwindling sub-populations of the sibling group until 1966, when the final selection, the NY 45500-5, was released to the public at the New York Fruit Testing Association meetings in Geneva, and given the name Empire. Cornell University commercially released the Empire with no restrictions or brand management. As a result, this variety was cultivated in large quantities during the late twentieth century. In 1974, the U.S. Department of Agriculture even listed the Empire as commercially valuable.

In 1986, the Teeple family of orchardists in Wolcott, New York, spotted a limb sport that was redder than the Empire but was otherwise the same. They patented it, but donated the rights to Cornell University, realizing that the original breeder of the apple had received no financial compensation for their work. This sport is now marketed as the Teeple Red Empire or Royal Empire. Being much redder, a high percentage of Royal Empire apples could qualify for the "extra fancy" grade. On the thirtieth anniversary of its commercial release, 1996, the Empire was the fifth most grown apple variety in New York State. Along with the Cortland, Jonagold, Jonamac, and Macoun, the Empire accounted for a fifth of all New York apple production. Since then, its popularity has waned due to the advent of newer varieties. Even so, according to the U.S. Apple Association, it is one of the nine most popular apple cultivars in that country. As of the 2020s, well over half of American Empire apples were harvested in New York State. Significant amounts also came from Michigan, and to a lesser extent, California, Pennsylvania, and Virginia.

The Empire is occasionally available at British supermarkets. In Canada, the majority of Empire apples are grown in Quebec and Ontario. The Empire remained one of the most common varieties in Quebec, as of the early 2020s.

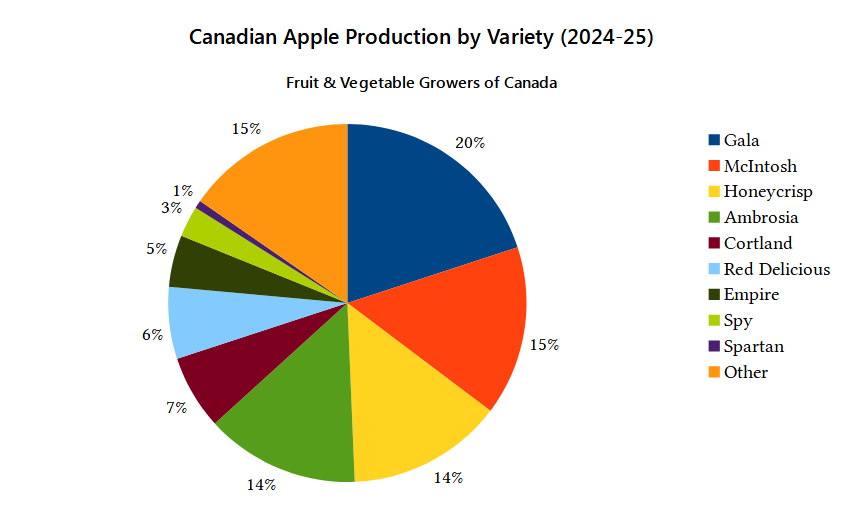
The Empire remains one of the most grown apple varieties in Canada during the 2020s.

== Sports patented in the US ==
By the year 2001, three mutant cultivars (sports) of the Empire had received US plant patents. None of them were mutants of mutants:

Date	Discoverer(s)	Marketed as	Assignee	Earlier	Color	Plant patent number
Mar 10, 1992	Harold F. Teeple, Russel H. Teeple, John B. Teeple	Teeple Red Empire, Royal Empire	Cornell	No	redder	US plant patent 7820
Oct 20, 1992	Harold Thome	TF808	Inter-Plant Patent Marketing	5–7 days	redder	US plant patent 8010
Feb 1, 2000	Jeffrey D. Crist	CB515, Crown Empire	Adams County Nursery	2.5 weeks	redder	US plant patent 11201

== Disease susceptibility ==
- Scab: high
- Powdery mildew: medium
- Cedar apple rust: low
- Fire blight: low

== See also ==
- Cortland (apple)
- Macoun apple
- Melrose (apple)
