= Liveland Raspberry apple =

Apple cultivar

'Liveland Raspberry'
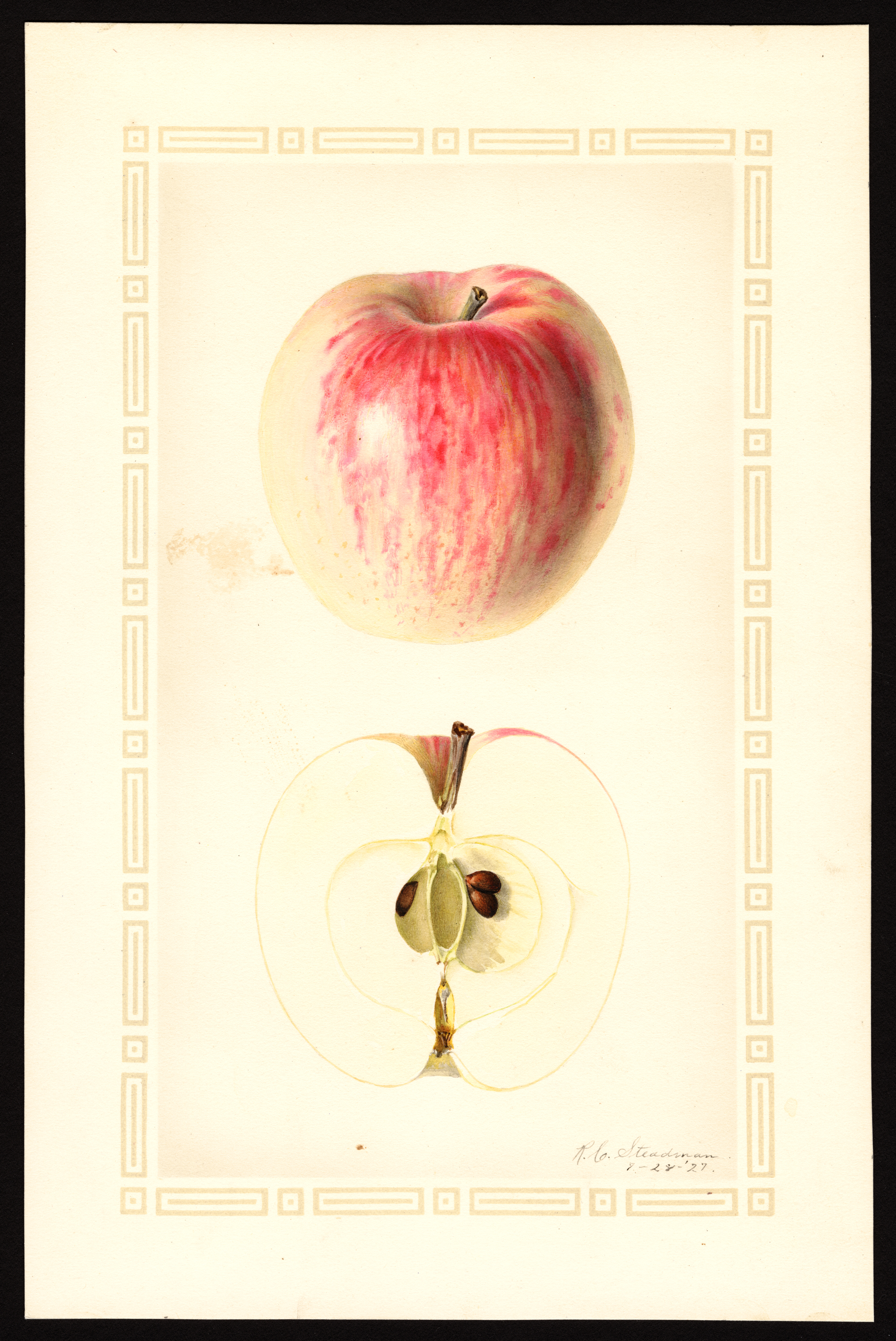
- Genus: Malus
- Species: M. domestica
- Cultivar: 'Liveland Raspberry' or 'Lowland Raspberry'
- Origin: Livland Governorate

Liveland Raspberry or Lowland Raspberry is an old cultivar of domesticated apple, first recorded before 1870, that originated from the Livland Governorate of eastern Europe and was introduced into the United States of America in 1883. It is a very early ripening apple.

== Descendants ==
- Melba (apple)
