= Macoun apple =

Apple cultivar

Macoun
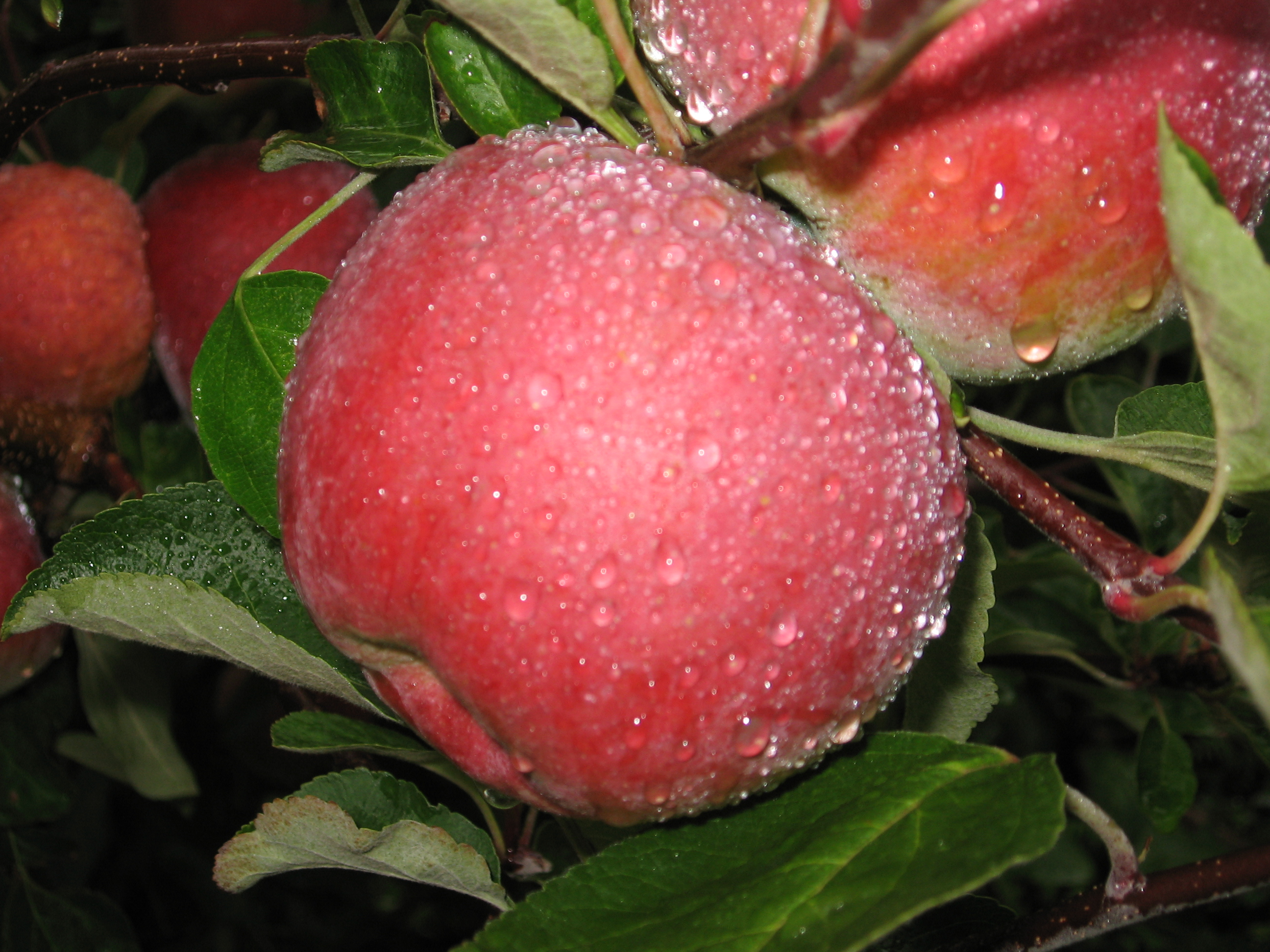
- Species: Malus domestica
- Hybrid parentage: McIntosh × Jersey Black
- Cultivar: Macoun
- Origin: (United States) Geneva, New York, 1909

The Macoun (pronounced Ma-cown, Ma-coon or McCowan) is a cultivated variety of apples developed at the New York State Agricultural Experiment Station in Geneva, New York. Named after Canadian horticulturalist W. T. Macoun, it is a hybrid the McIntosh and Jersey Black. Cross pollination was done in 1909 and the Macoun was commercially released in 1932. It is suitable for dessert and for making apple cider, applesauce, and salads.

Although the patent application for the Honeycrisp apple stated that it was descended from Macoun crossed with Honeygold, genetic testing has disproved this.

The price look-up code (PLU) for all sizes of Macoun apples is 3073.

== Characteristics ==
The Macoun ripens in late fall. In New York, it is available from October through November. The Macoun is a medium-size apple that has a waxy, smooth, and tough skin, covered with purplish red flushes and stripes. Its flesh is greenish-white, crisp, and juicy, but is easily bruised.

This variety is resistant to fire blight, but susceptible to apple scab and powdery mildew. In humid regions, it is also vulnerable to frogeye leaf spot.

== See also ==
- Cortland (apple)
- Empire (apple)
