= Cortland (apple) =

Apple cultivar

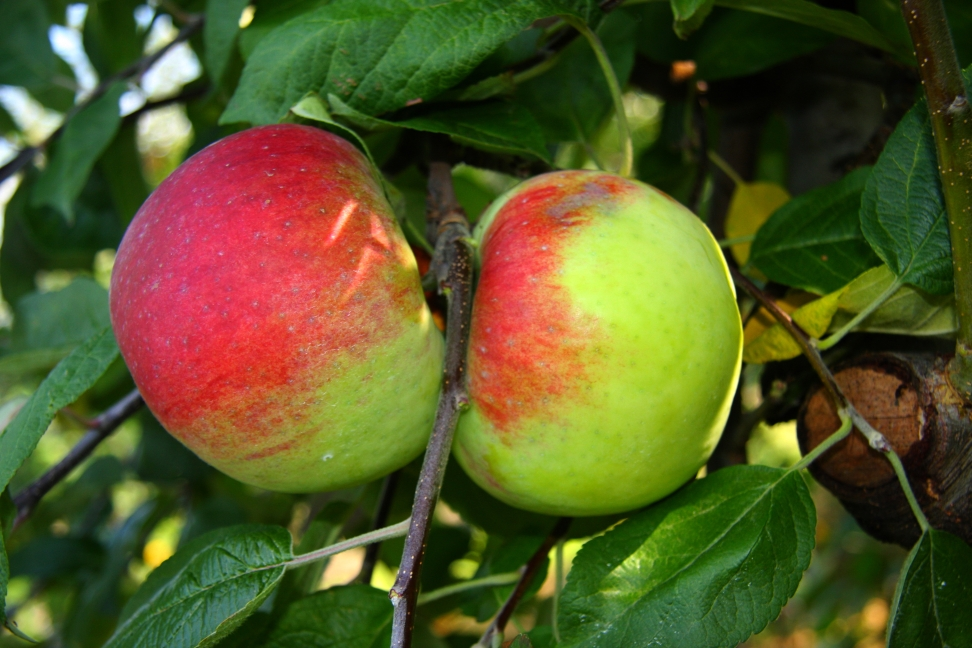
- Species: Malus domestica
- Hybrid parentage: McIntosh × Ben Davis
- Cultivar: Cortland
- Breeder: Spencer Ambrose Beach
- Origin: (United States) Geneva, New York, 1898

Cortland is a cultivar of apple developed at the New York State Agricultural Experiment Station in Geneva, New York, United States in 1898. It is a cross of the McIntosh and Ben Davis apples. It was named after Cortland County, near Ithaca, New York, home of Cornell University. It was first bred by American horticulturalist S.A Beach.

== Characteristics ==
After the many attributes of McIntosh were discovered, plant breeders began crossing it with other varieties to enhance its traits. One of the earliest was the Cortland. The Cortland is capable of high yield in cold climates. It ripens in early October. It is harvested after the Gala and McIntosh, and at about the same time as the Honeycrisp.

The Cortland apple is a flattened and irregular apple. Its skin is greenish yellow and deep red. Compared to the McIntosh, the Cortland is a sweet apple. It has white and juicy flesh, with a somewhat coarse texture. Cortland is a soft apple, but not as soft as McIntosh. Cortland is resistant to browning and is therefore suitable for fruit salads and charcuterie boards. It could also be used to make the filling for apple pie; in this capacity, the Cortland, a relatively sweet apple, can be used together with the McIntosh, which is more tart. Apple sauce made with the Cortland has a pink tinge. Using the Cortland with a sweeter variety, such the Honeygold or Mutsu, could enhance the flavor.

== Cultivation ==
In the United States, the Cortland is most commonly grown in New York, which is responsible for four fifths of total Cortland production in the country. It was a key variety in Vermont until the end of the twentieth century, when a tougher level of competition forced farmers to switch to more profitable varieties, such as the Honeycrisp, as well as new business models, notably pick-your-own orchards.

In Nova Scotia, Canada, during the late 2000s, apple orchardists replaced the McIntosh and Cortland with newer varieties that brought multiple times more money per bin, namely the Ambrosia, Gala, and especially the Honeycrisp. As of the mid-2020s, most of Canada's Cortland apples are harvested in Quebec and Ontario. During that time, it was one of the dominant varieties in Quebec.

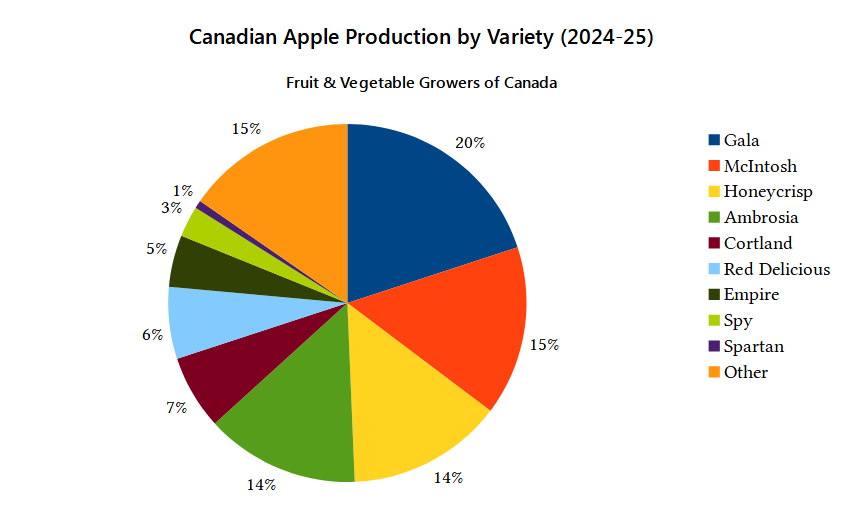
The Cortland remains one of the top ten apple varieties in Canada, as of the mid-2020s.

== Patented mutants (sports) ==
The original Cortland variety, introduced in 1915 by the New York State Agricultural Experiment Station, produced apples which were 20–30% red, and was not patented. Since then, several sports have been identified and patented:

Date	"Inventor"	Marketed as	Mutated from	Assignee	Habit	Pattern	Earlier	Color	Plant patent number
Jan 19, 1982	LaMont	Lamont, Starkspur	standard	Stark Bro's Nursery	spur	striped	same	same	US plant patent 4800
Aug 30, 1983	Nicklin	Redcort	standard	Hilltop Nursery	standard	striped	2 wk.	90% red	US plant patent 5095
Oct 7, 1997	Hartenhof	NS-911	standard	Adams County Nursery	standard	striped	same	red overall	US plant patent 10049

== Descendant cultivars ==
- Birgit Bonnier

== See also ==
- Empire (apple)
- Macoun apple
- Spartan (apple)
