= Wilhelm Lauche =

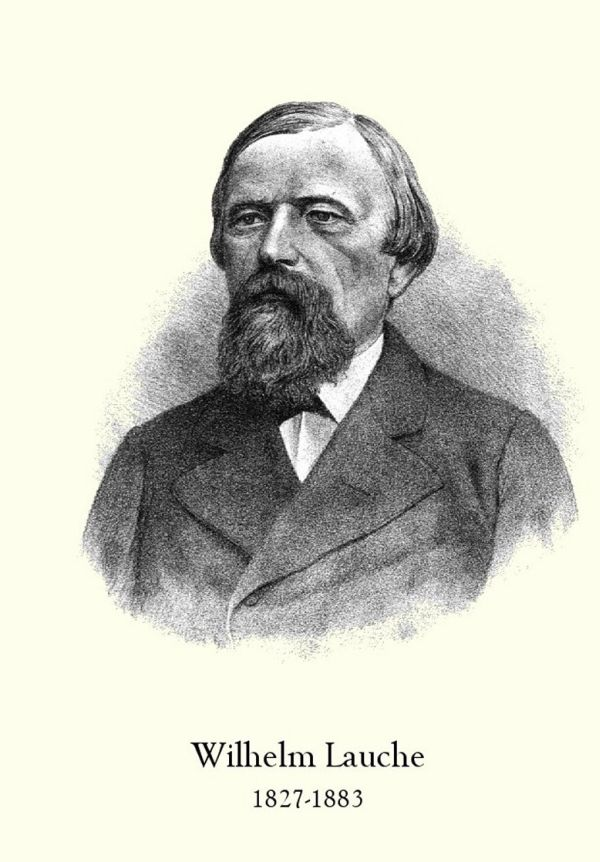
Wilhelm Lauche

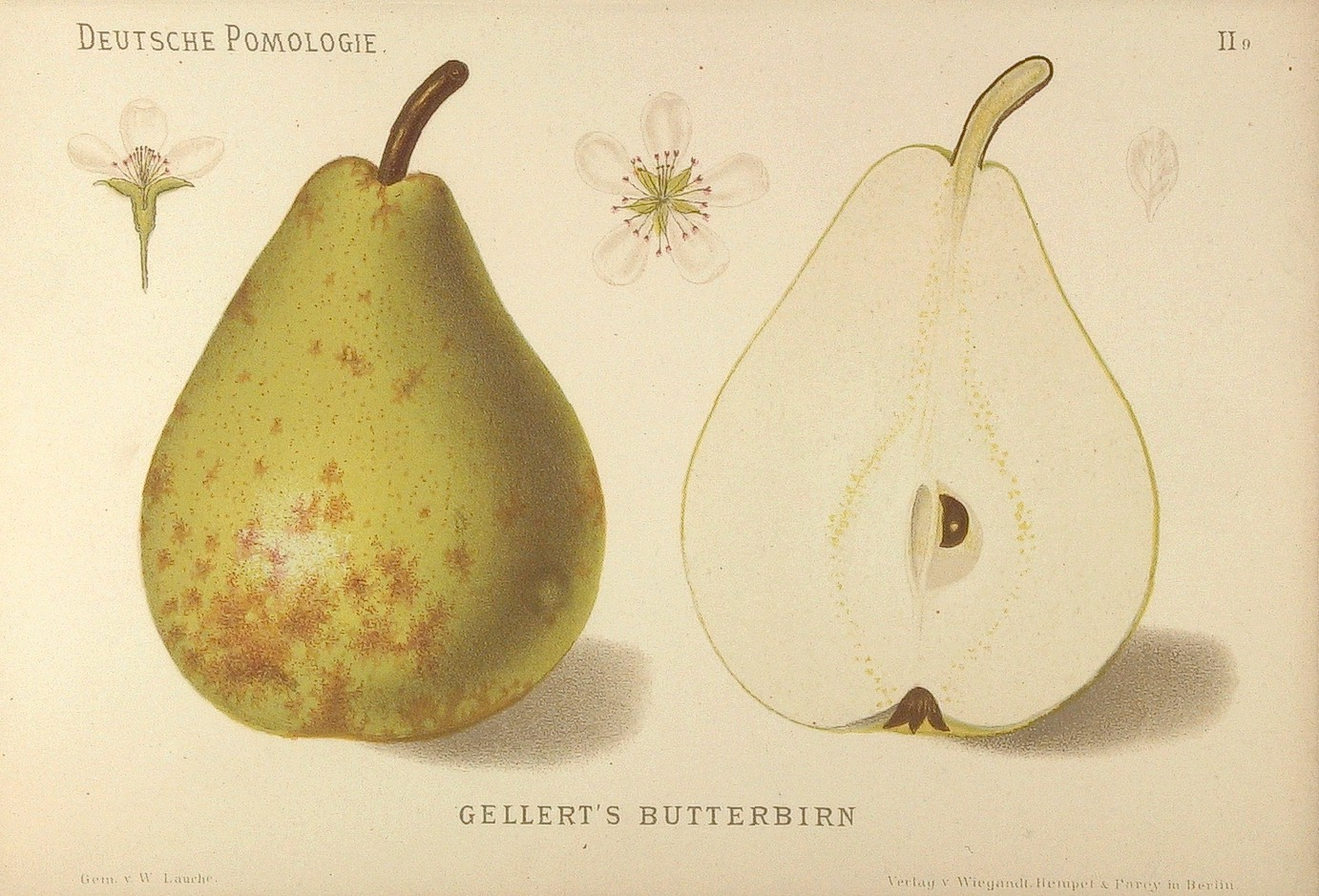

Wilhelm Lauche (21 May 1827, Gartow – 12 September 1883) was a German gardener, dendrologist and pomologist.

== Horticultural career ==
Lauche was the son of a palace gardener for the Count of Bernstorff in Gartow, and so early was familiar with the nursery. He received his horticultural training at the Schloss Ludwigslust park and deepened it in various places such as Erfurt, Hannover, and Potsdam. Lauche spent five years planting nurseries near Potsdam, until he founded his own market garden.

Because of his reputation, in 1869 he was transferred as a royal garden supervisor to the technical management of the Royal Gardening and Nursery School (Königlichen Landesbaumschule und Gärtner-Lehranstalt) in Potsdam, which is closely linked with his name. From 1877 to 1879 he was board chairman of the German Pomological Society (Deutscher Pomologenverein).

Models of fruit that he made for a "pomological cabinet" are still visible today in the collection of the German Horticultural Museum, Erfurt.

== Works ==
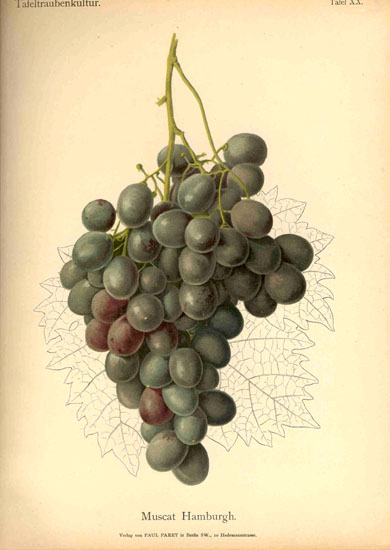
Chromolithograph of Muscat Hamburgh grapes in Handbuch der Tafeltraubenkultur (Handbook of Table Grape Culture)

- Deutsche Pomologie, Berlin 1879 – 1884, 6 sections, 300 colour illustrations
- Deutsche Dendrologie, Berlin 1880
- Handbuch des Obstbaues, Berlin 1881
- Supplement to Eduard Lucas & Johann Georg Conrad Oberdieck, Illustriertes Handbuch der Obstkunde, Parey, Berlin 1883
- Rudolf Goethe & Wilhelm Lauche: Handbuch der Tafeltraubenkultur. Berlin, Paul Parey, 1895. Produced after Lauche's death, this book uses his illustrations of grapes, one of which is shown to the right.
