= Suntan (apple) =

Apple cultivar

'Suntan' apple
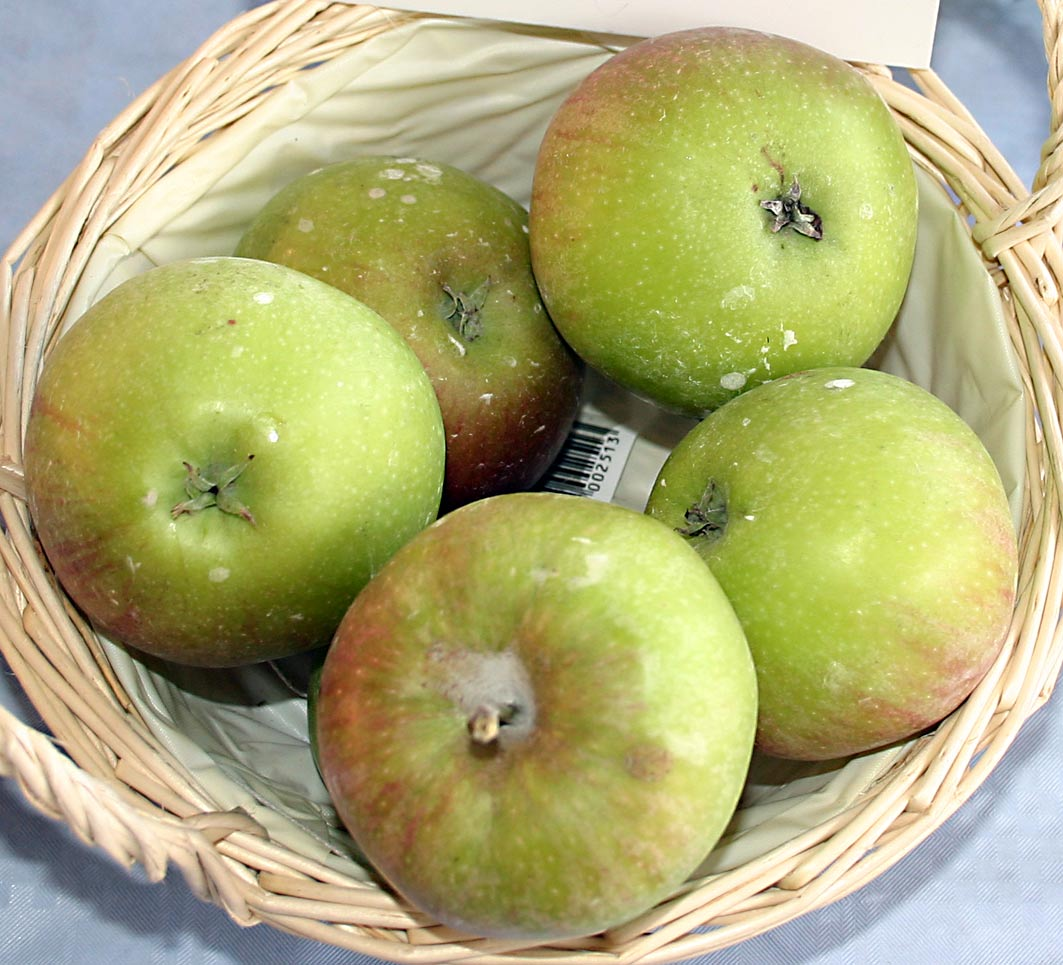
- Genus: Malus
- Species: Malus pumila
- Hybrid parentage: Cox's Orange Pippin x Court Pendu Plat
- Cultivar: 'Suntan'
- Origin: England, Kent 1956

Suntan is an English cultivar of domesticated apple that have earned the Award of Garden Merit by the Royal Horticultural Society in 1999.

It is said to be a somatic hybrid between the very popular Cox's Orange Pippin which is very popular in England for its delicious taste but is susceptible to many diseases, and the Court Pendu Plat. It produces medium to large fruit, with attractive skin of golden yellow background which is flushed and striped with orange red, and some russeting. The interior flesh is cream yellowish, with a rather crisp and coarse texture, still fairly juicy. Taste can be too sharp when picked but mellows in storage.

Is somewhat susceptible to powdery mildew and to canker, but for those who like the intense taste, it is worth the hassle.
