= Ben Davis (apple) =

Apple cultivar

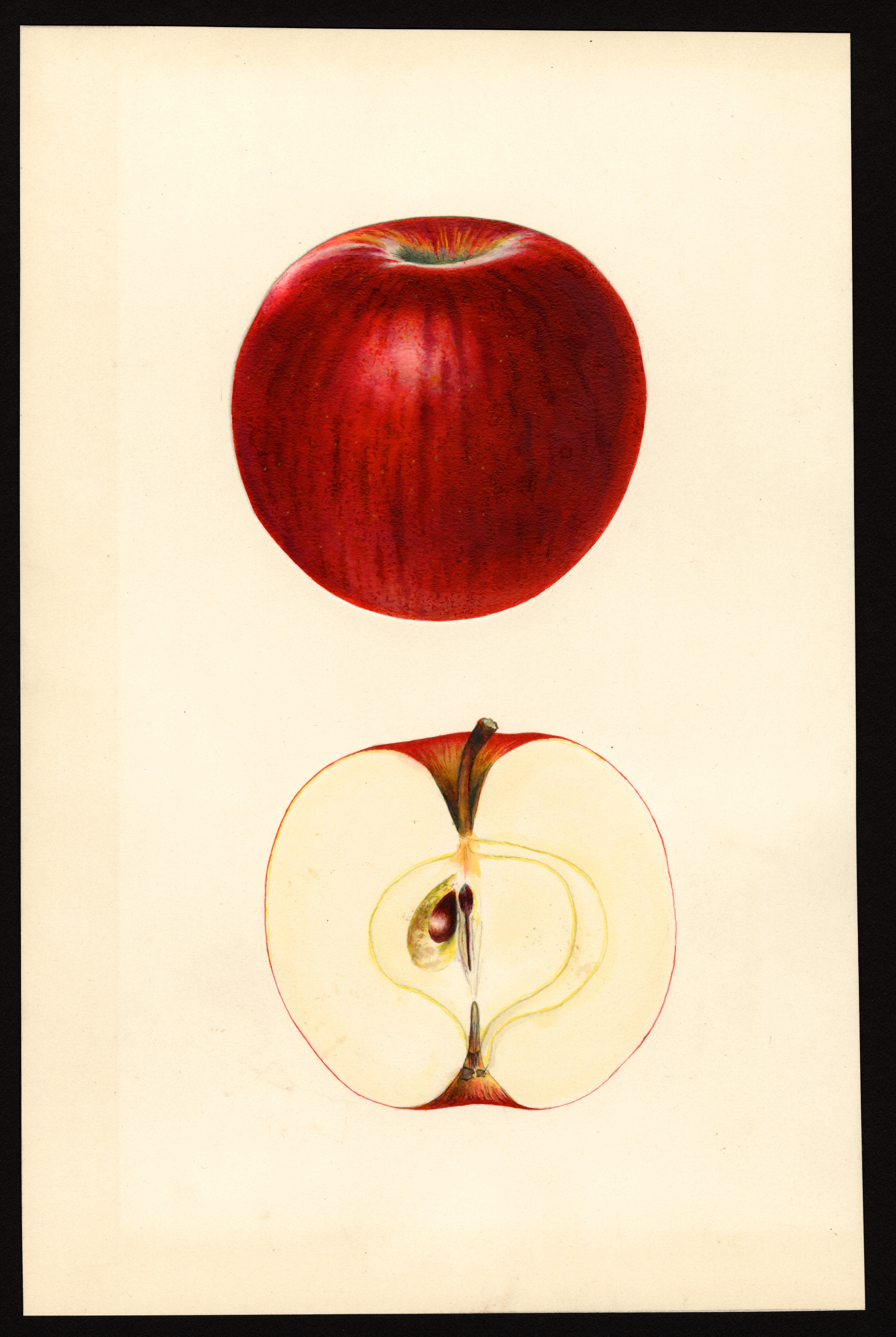
- Species: Malus domestica
- Cultivar: Ben Davis
- Origin: (United States) late 19th century

Ben Davis is an American apple cultivar. A typical Ben Davis apple has width 74-80 mm, height 63-75 mm, and stalk 19-23 mm.

== History ==
The sources are conflicting about the origins of the Ben Davis. Some claim it first appeared around 1880 in Arkansas while others indicate it came from Kentucky, Tennessee, or Virginia. During the 19th century and early 20th century the Ben Davis was a popular commercial apple due to the ruggedness and keeping qualities of the fruit. At that time, it was known to farmers as a "mortgage lifter" because it was a reliable producer. Following the American Civil War, the Ben Davis became popular for cider making.As packing and transportation techniques improved, however, the cultivar fell out of favor, replaced by others considered to have better flavor.

In 1892, Stark Nurseries held a competition to find a replacement for the Ben Davis. The winner was a red and yellow striped apple sent by Jesse Hiatt, a farmer in Peru, Iowa, who called it "Hawkeye" in honor of his home state. This variety was later renamed the Red Delicious.

== Related apples ==
Cornell University crossed the Ben Davis with the McIntosh to create the Cortland, which is also capable of bearing heavy crops.

Similar cultivars known as Gano or Black Ben Davis (a.k.a. Black Ben) appeared in parts of the American South (notably Arkansas and Virginia) in the 1880s. They are said to be either seedlings of, or bud-mutation of Ben Davis, but the exact relationship is unknown.

== Gallery ==
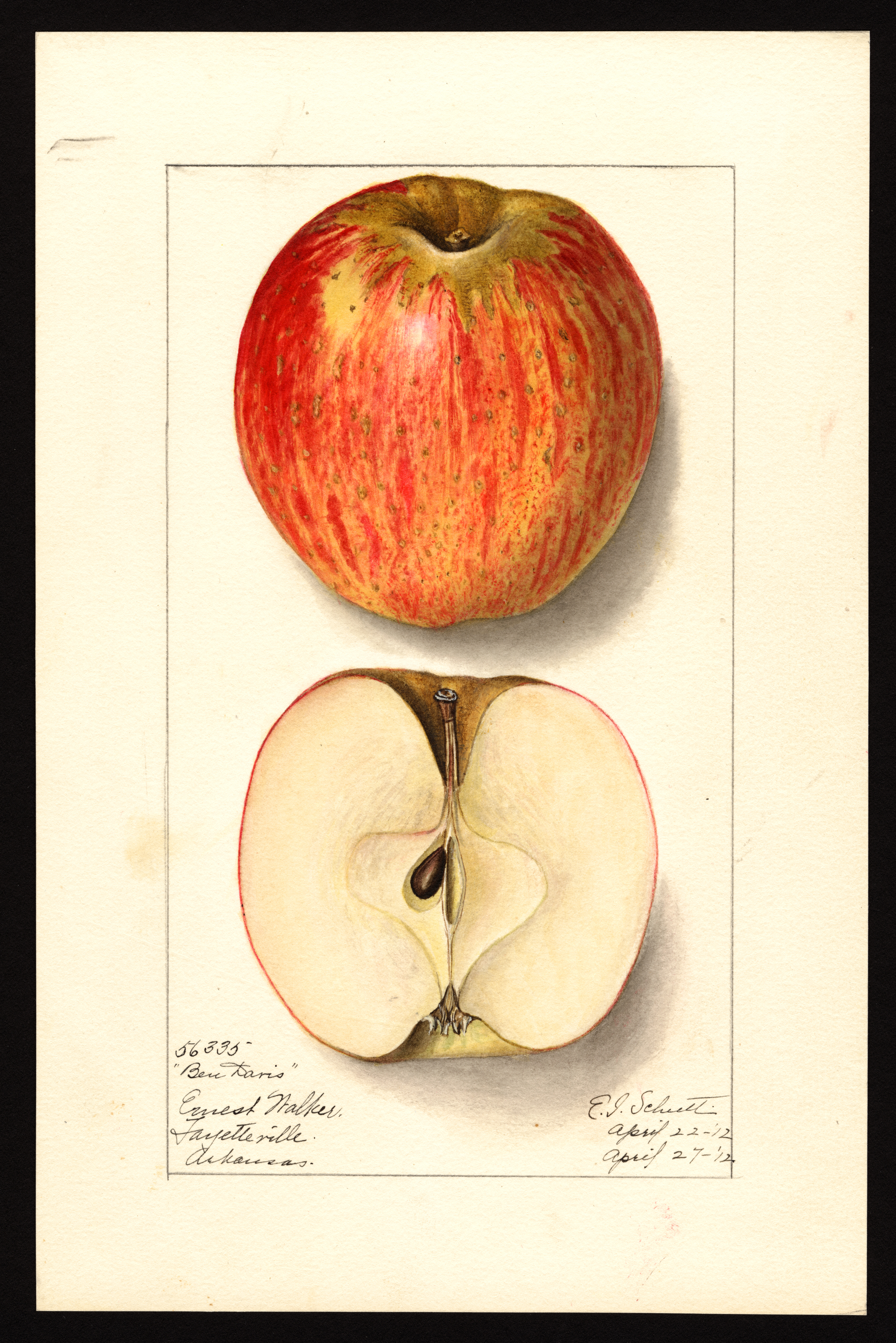
Ben Davis

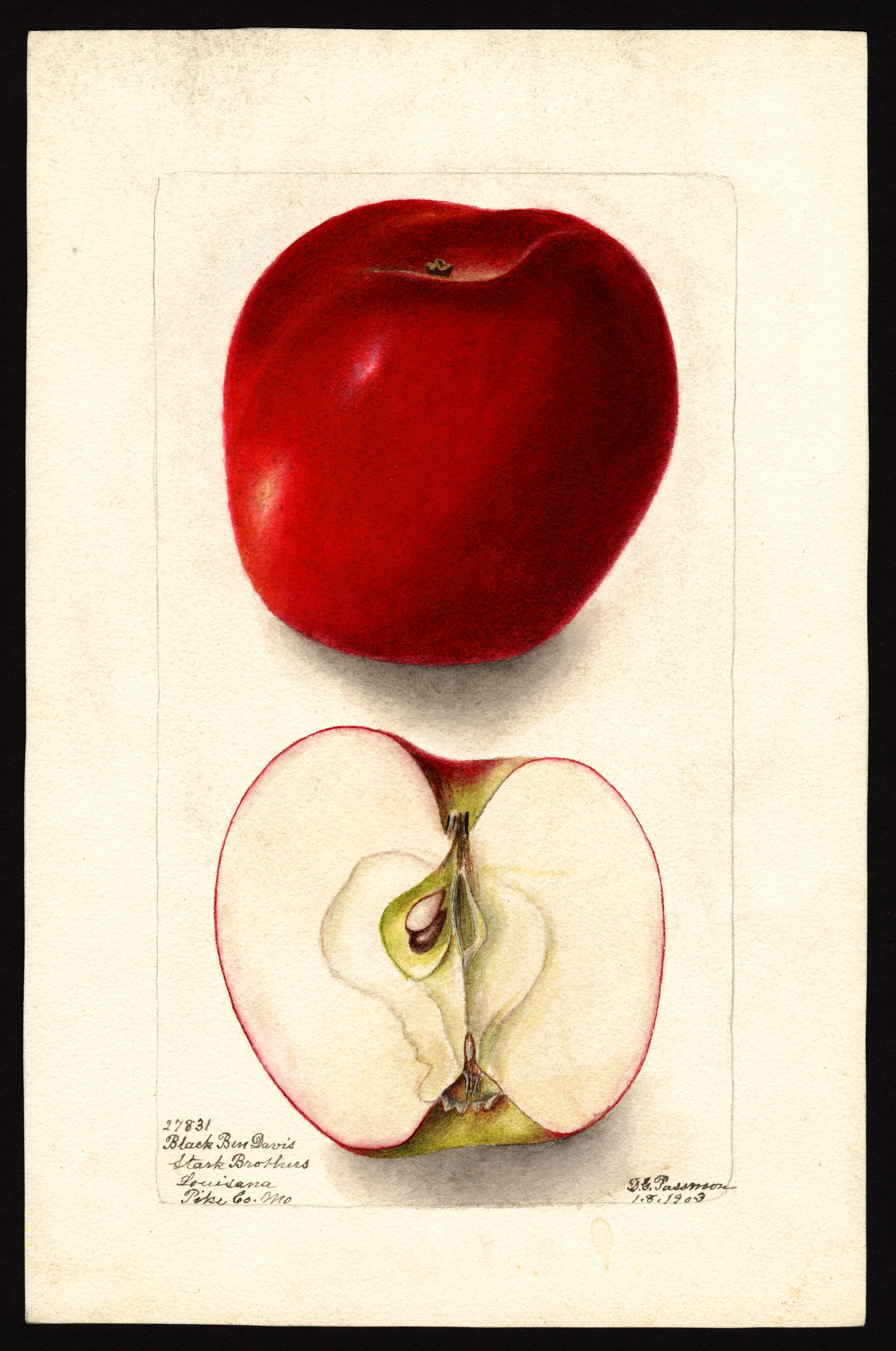
Black Ben Davis

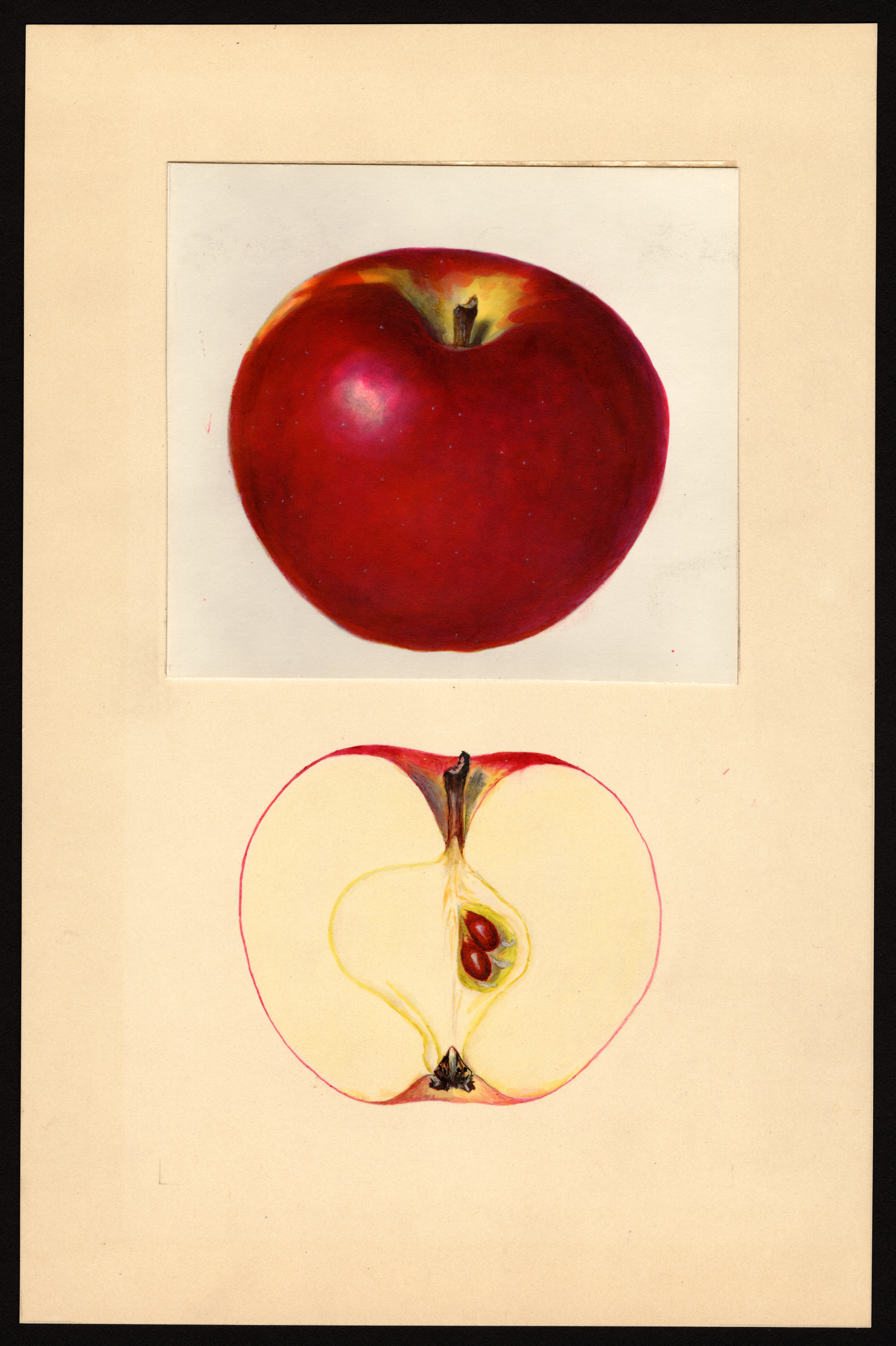
Gano
