= McIntosh (apple) =

National apple of Canada

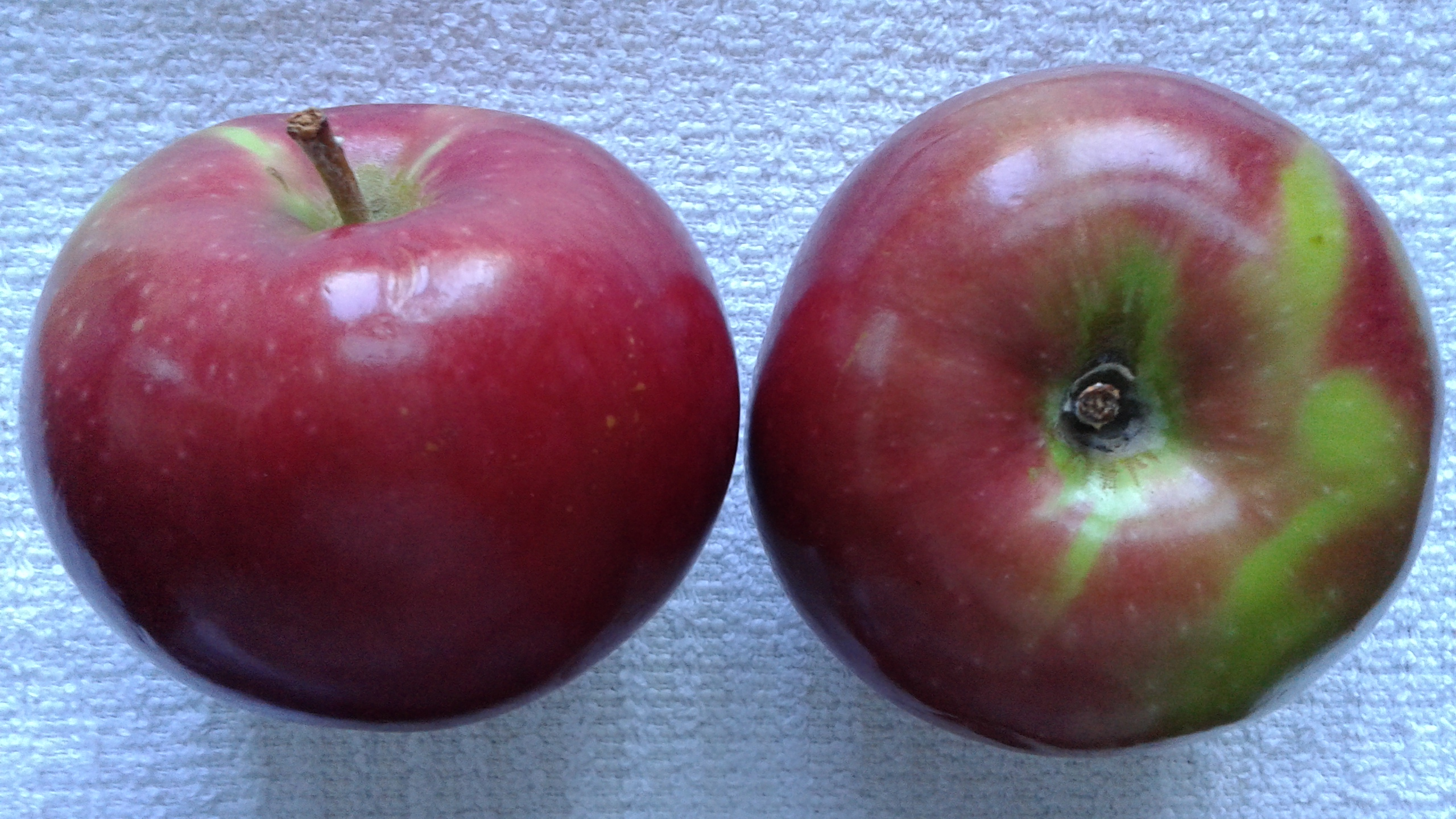
- Species: Malus domestica
- Hybrid parentage: Chance seedling
- Cultivar: McIntosh
- Origin: (United Kingdom) Dundela, Upper Canada, 1811 (now Southern Ontario)

The McIntosh ( /ˈmækɪnˌtɒʃ/ MAK-in-tosh), McIntosh Red, or colloquially the Mac, is a cultivated variety of apple, considered to be the national apple of Canada. The fruit has red and green skin, a tart flavor, and tender white flesh, which ripens in late September. An all-purpose apple, the McIntosh may be eaten raw, baked, cooked, or used to make apple cider and apple sauce.

John McIntosh discovered the original McIntosh sapling on his Dundela farm in Upper Canada in 1811. He and his wife cultivated it, and the family started grafting the tree and selling the fruit in 1835. In 1870, it entered commercial production, and became common in Ontario, Quebec, New England, and New York after 1900. While still produced in large quantities, the fruit's popularity fell in the early 21st century in the face of competition from newer varieties such as the Ambrosia, Gala, and Honeycrisp.

Jef Raskin, an employee at Apple Computer, named the Macintosh computer line—later abbreviated to "Mac" in 1999—after the cultivar.

== Description ==
The McIntosh, or McIntosh Red (nicknamed the "Mac"), is one of the most popular apple cultivar in eastern Canada and the northeastern United States. It also sells well in Eastern Europe. So well-known is this variety that its taste has become a category of its own.

A spreading tree that is moderately vigorous, the McIntosh bears annually or in alternate years. The tree is hardy to at least USDA Hardiness zone 4a, or −34 °C (−29 °F). 50% or more of its flowers die at −3.1 °C (26.4 °F) or below. It can be a pollinating partner for many other varieties.

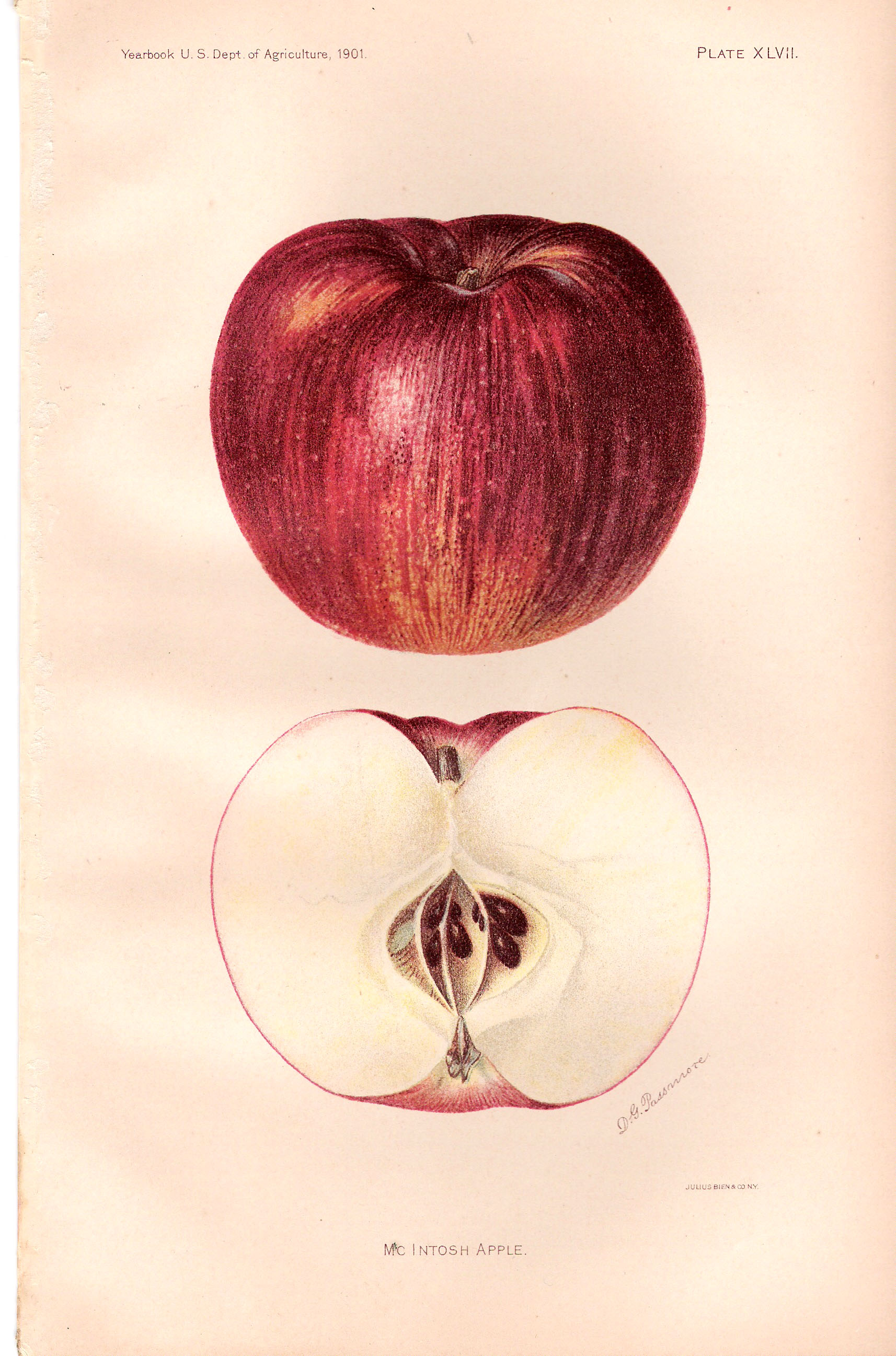
A McIntosh that was illustrated in 1901

The McIntosh apple is a small to medium-sized round fruit with a short stem. It has a red and green skin that is thick, tender, and easy to peel. Its white flesh is sometime tinged with green or pink and is juicy, tender, and firm, soon becoming soft. The flesh is easily bruised.

The McIntosh is a general-purpose apple; it is suitable both for eating raw and for cooking. It is used primarily for dessert, and requires less time to cook than most cultivars. It is usually blended when used for juice or cider. It could also be used to make apple sauce and apple pie.

The fruit grows best in cool areas where nights are cold and autumn days are clear; otherwise, it suffers from poor colour and soft flesh, and tends to fall from the tree before harvest. It stores for two to three months in air, but is prone to scald, flesh softening, chilling sensitivity, and coprinus rot. It can become mealy when stored at temperatures below 2 °C (36 °F). The fruit is optimally stored in a controlled atmosphere in which temperatures are between 1.7 and 3.0 °C (35.1 and 37.4 °F), and air content is 1.5–4.5% oxygen and 1–5% carbon dioxide; under such conditions, the McIntosh will keep for five to eight months.

== Cultivation ==
The McIntosh is most commonly cultivated in Canada, the United States, and Eastern Europe. As of the 2020s, most of Canada's McIntosh came from Quebec and Ontario. South of the border, more than two thirds of McIntosh apples were harvested in New York State. It is one of the top five apple cultivars used in cloning, and research indicates the McIntosh combines well for winter hardiness.

If unsprayed, the McIntosh succumbs easily to apple scab, which may lead to entire crops being unmarketable. It has generally low susceptibility to fire blight, powdery mildew, cedar-apple rust, quince rust, and hawthorn rust. It is susceptible to fungal diseases such as Nectria canker, brown rot, black rot, race 1 of apple rust (but resists race 2). Furthermore, it is moderately resistant to Pezicula bark rot and Alternaria leaf blotch, and resists brown leaf spots well.

The McIntosh is harvested in the middle of fall, roughly at the same time as the Gala and Honeycrisp.

The McIntosh is one of the most common cultivars used in apple breeding; a 1996 study found that the McIntosh was a parent in 101 of 439 cultivars selected, more than any other founding clone. (Note: The same study found that 64% of the cultivars selected came from five founding clones: in descending order, the McIntosh, the Golden Delicious, the Jonathan, the Cox's Orange Pippin, and the Red Delicious.) It was used in over half of the Canadian cultivars selected, and was used extensively in the United States and Eastern Europe as well. But rarely was it used elsewhere. Offspring of the McIntosh include: the Macoun (with the Jersey Black), the Spartan, the Cortland (with the Ben Davis); the Empire (with the Red Delicious); the Jonamac, the Jersey Mac, the Lobo, the Melba, the Summered, the Tydeman's Red, and possibly the Paula Red.

== History ==
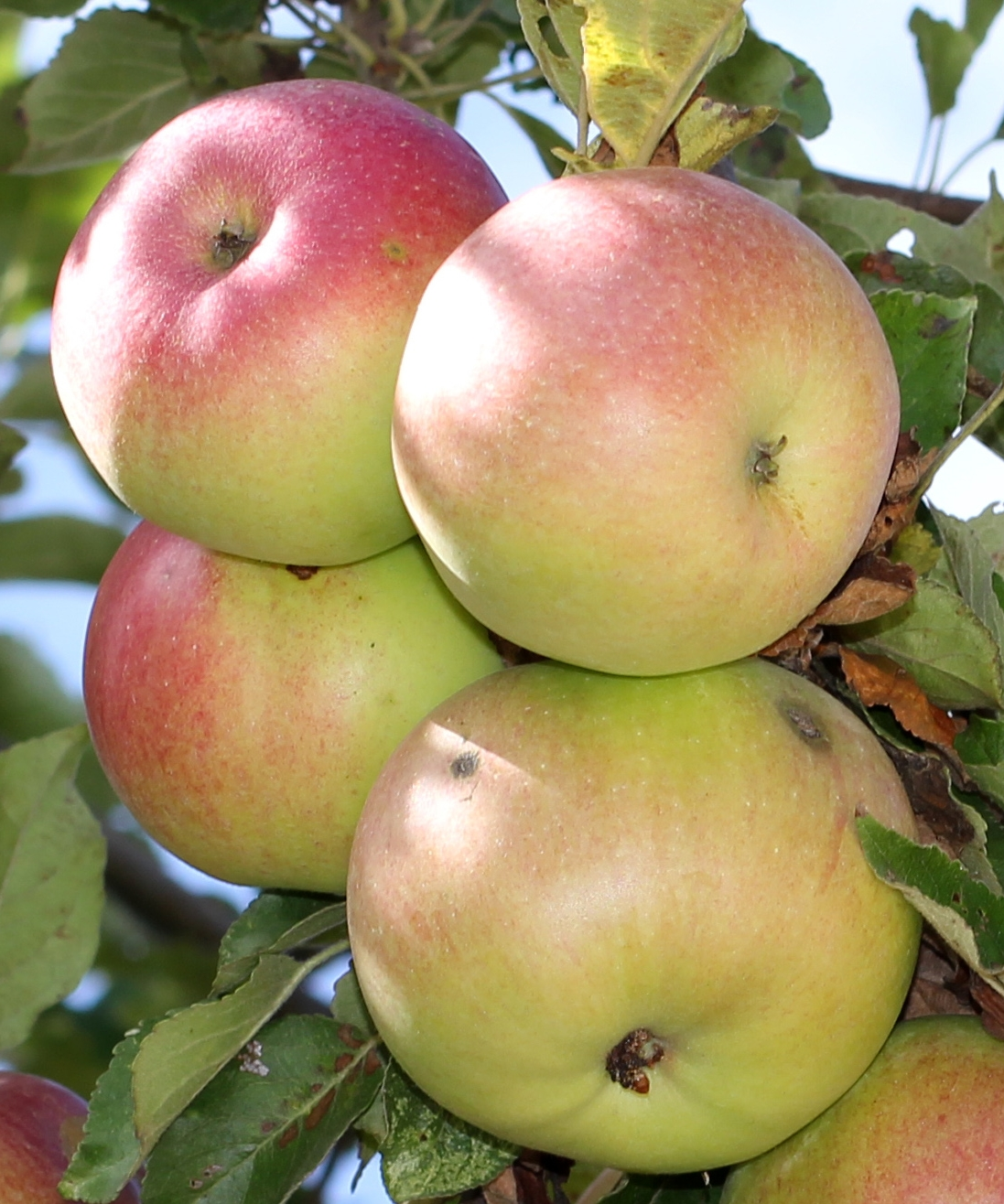
McIntosh apples on a tree

Apple trees were introduced to Canada at the Habitation at Port-Royal as early as 1606 by French settlers. Following its introduction, apple cultivation spread inland.

The McIntosh's discoverer, John McIntosh (1777 – c. 1845–46), left his native Mohawk Valley home in New York State in 1796 to follow his love, Dolly Irwin, who had been taken to Upper Canada by her Loyalist parents. She had died by the time he found her, but he settled as a farmer in Upper Canada. He married Hannah Doran in 1801, and they farmed along the Saint Lawrence River until 1811, (Note: Several print and online sources, as well as the 1996 commemorative silver dollar, have mistakenly stated 1796 as the year of the McIntosh's discovery. 1796 was the year of McIntosh's immigration to Canada. The confusion may have stemmed from an error on the 1912 plaque erected by the McIntosh family.) when McIntosh exchanged the land he had with his brother-in-law Edward Doran for a plot in Dundela. (Note: Dundela is about 70 km south of Ottawa, the Canadian capital.)

While clearing the overgrown plot, McIntosh discovered some apple seedlings on his farm. Since the crabapple was the only native apple in North America before European settlement, it must have had European origins. The Snow Apple (or Fameuse) had been popular in Lower Canada before that time; the seedlings may have sprouted from discarded fruit. Fall St Lawrence and Alexander have also been proposed, but the parentage remains unknown. He transplanted the seedlings next to his house. One of the seedlings bore particularly good fruit. The McIntosh grandchildren dubbed the fruit it produced "Granny's apple", as they often saw their grandmother taking care of the tree in the orchard. McIntosh was selling seedlings from the tree by 1820, but they did not produce fruit of the quality of the original.

John McIntosh's son Allan (1815–1899) learned grafting about 1835; with this cloning, the McIntoshes could maintain the distinctive properties of the fruit of the original tree. Allan and brother Sandy (1825–1906), nicknamed "Sandy the Grafter", increased production and promotion of the cultivar. Earliest sales were in 1835, and in 1836 the cultivar was renamed the "McIntosh Red"; (Note: The "Gem" was also considered as a name for the apple.) it entered commercial production in 1870. The apple became popular after 1900, when the first sprays for apple scab were developed. A house fire damaged the original McIntosh tree in 1894; it last produced fruit in 1908, and died and fell over in 1910. Horticulturist William Tyrrell Macoun of the Central Experimental Farm in Ottawa is credited with popularizing the McIntosh in Canada, praising it as "one of the finest appearing and best dessert apples" available at the time. The Macoun, a hybrid of the McIntosh and Jersey Black grown by the Agricultural Experiment Station in Geneva, New York, was named for him in 1923.

The original tree discovered by John McIntosh bore fruit for more than ninety years, and died in 1910. Horticulturalists from the Upper Canada Village heritage park saved cuttings from the last known first-generation McIntosh graft before it died in 2011 for producing clones.

=== Popularity and sales ===
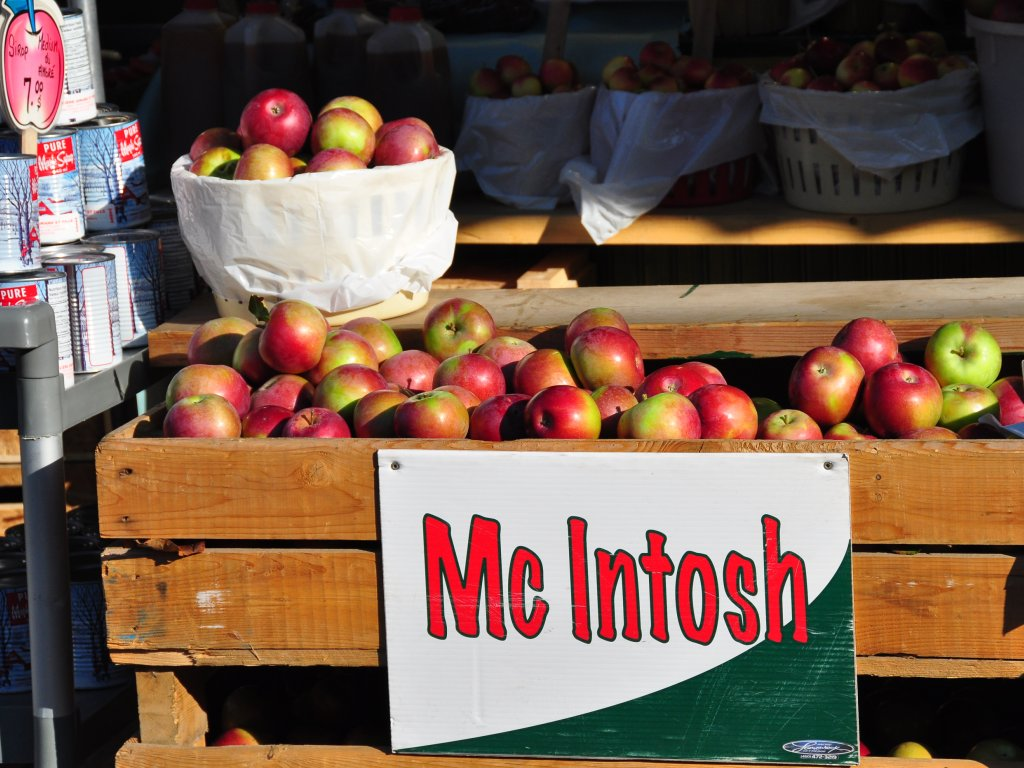
McIntosh apples on sale at the Jean-Talon Market in Montreal. As of the early 2020s, the McIntosh remains one of the dominant varieties in Quebec, but has been losing market share for some time.

During the twentieth century, the McIntosh was the most popular cultivar in Eastern Canada and New England; it was also widely sold in the United Kingdom. The McIntosh made up 40% of the Canadian apple market by the 1960s; and at least thirty varieties of McIntosh hybrid were known by 1970. However, its market share declined to 28% in 2014 and is expected to continue to do so, in part due to production cost and in part due to consumers favoring sweeter, crisper, and less tart apple varieties. Its popularity has also waned in the face of competition from imports; in the first decade of the 21st century, the Gala (imported from Chile or the United States) accounted for 33% of the apple market in Ontario to the McIntosh's 12%, and the Northern Spy had become the preferred apple for pies. Production remained important to Ontario, however, as 30,000,000 kilograms (66,000,000 lb) of McIntosh apples were produced in 2010. In Nova Scotia, apple orchardists reinvigorated their businesses during the late 2000s by replacing McIntosh and Cortland with newer varieties that brought in more money per bin, namely the Ambrosia, Gala, and especially the Honeycrisp. In Quebec, over a third of all apples harvested were McIntosh, as of the early 2020s. Production remained relatively high in part because many orchardists were at the end of their careers with no successors, and as such were not keen to replace the McIntosh with newer varieties. A significant portion of McIntosh apples harvested in Quebec was sent for processing while the average retail price of a McIntosh was only a third that of a Honeycrisp. Nevertheless, the McIntosh is unlikely to disappear in the foreseeable future due to persistent residual demand for legacy varieties, which do not require royalties for cultivation and sales, unlike the newer managed varieties.

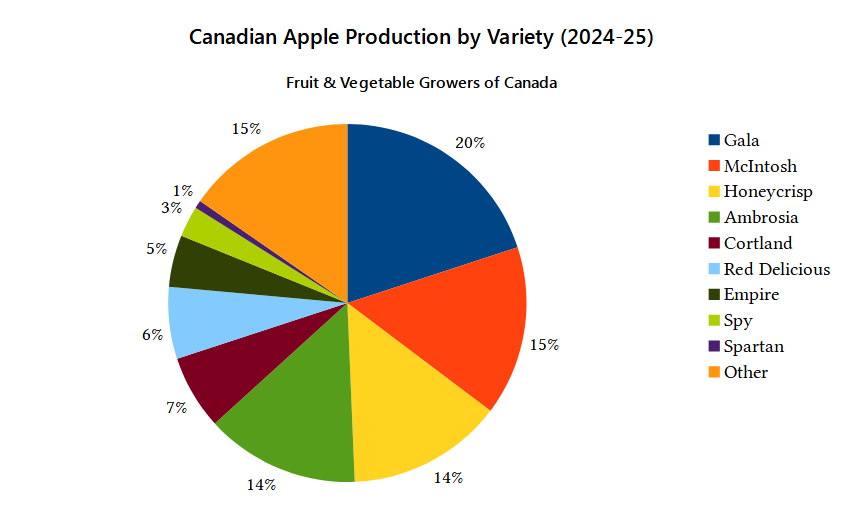
Despite the arrival of new competitors, the McIntosh remains one of the most produced apple varieties in Canada during the 2020s.

In the United States, the McIntosh was one of the most produced apples during the twentieth century, behind only the Red Delicious and the Golden Delicious. In the Northeastern United States, the McIntosh replaced many Baldwin trees that were killed in a severe winter in 1933–34. The McIntosh become the second most popular variety in the 1970s, after the Red Delicious. According to the US Apple Association, it remains one of the nine most popular apple cultivars in that country, as of 2025. By the 2020s, however, total production of the McIntosh, measured in bushels, has fallen behind that of a new variety, the Cosmic Crisp. Even in New York, which has traditionally favoured the McIntosh, production has fallen from about a quarter of the state's total volume in the 1980s to about 14 percent in the 2020s. The decline of older varieties like the McIntosh and Red Delicious follows the advent of newer varieties like the Honeycrisp, offering consumers sweeter and more complex tastes. They also risk becoming mere commodities—that is, common and cheap products—making it them less profitable for farmers and distributors.

=== Descendant cultivars ===
Descendant cultivars from McIntosh
Name	Parentage	Selected year	Introduced year
Bancroft	McIntosh x Forest	1930	
Edgar	McIntosh x Forest	1929	
Barry	McIntosh x Cox´s Orange Pippin		1957
Toshfor	McIntosh x Forest		1926
Maud	McIntosh x Longfield		1921
Sharon	McIntosh x Longfield	1920	1922
Blair	McIntosh x Fameuse	1944	1973
Jubilee	McIntosh x Grimes Golden	1936	1939
Macoun	McIntosh x Jersey Black	1918	1923
Toshlaw	McIntosh x Lawver		1925
Fantazja	McIntosh x Linda	1954	1960
South Dakota Macata	McIntosh x Malus Baccata		1938
Toshkee	McIntosh x Milwaukee		1923
Spartan	McIntosh x Newtown	1936	
Maga	McIntosh x Virginia Crab	1919	1933
Michaelmas Red	McIntosh x Worcester Pearmain		1945
Tydemans Early Worcester	McIntosh x Worcester Pearmain		1945
Newtosh	McIntosh x Yellow Newtown	1922	1923
Killand	McIntosh x Dolgo	1951	1957
Northland	McIntosh x Dolgo	1938	1957
Stonetosh	Stone x McIntosh		1922
Rosilda	Prince x McIntosh	1916	1921
Cortland	Ben Davis x McIntosh		1915
Toshprince	Prince x McIntosh		1923
McPrince	Prince x McIntosh		1922
Niagara	Carlton x McIntosh	1950	1962
George	McIntosh O.P.		1948
Glendale	McIntosh O.P.	1948	1956
Glenelm	McIntosh O.P.	1945	1952
Glenmary	McIntosh O.P.	1940	1948
Glenwale	McIntosh O.P.	1940	1958
Kress McIntosh	McIntosh O.P.	1920	1934
Lobo	McIntosh O.P.	1906	1930
Melba	McIntosh O.P.	1909	1924
Patricia	McIntosh O.P.	1920	
Reta	McIntosh O.P.		1953

O.P. = Open Pollinated

== Cultural significance ==
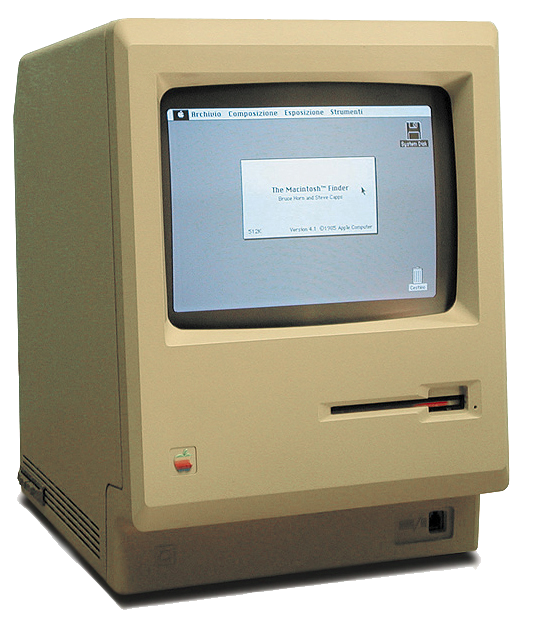
Apple Inc.'s Macintosh line of personal computers was named after the fruit.

The McIntosh has been designated the national apple of Canada. A popular subscription funded a plaque placed 100 metres (110 yd) from the original McIntosh tree in 1912. The Ontario Archaeological and Historic Sites Board replaced the plaque with a more descriptive one in 1962, and the Historic Sites and Monuments Board of Canada put up another in a park nearby in 2001, by a painted mural commemorating the fruit.

Apple Inc. employee Jef Raskin named the Macintosh line of personal computers after the McIntosh. He deliberately misspelled the name to avoid conflict with the hi-fi equipment manufacturer McIntosh Laboratory. Apple's attempt in 1982 to trademark the name Macintosh was nevertheless denied due to the phonetic similarity between Apple's product and the name of the hi-fi manufacturer. Apple licensed the rights to the name in 1983, and bought the trademark in 1986.

In 1995, the Royal Canadian Mint commissioned Toronto artist Roger Hill to design a commemorative silver dollar for release in 1996. Mint engraver Sheldon Beveridge engraved the image of a group of three McIntoshes and a McIntosh blossom, which adorn one side with a ribbon naming the variety. An inscription on the edge reads "1796 Canada Dollar 1996". Issued sheathed in a silver cardboard sleeve in a black leatherette case, 133,779 pieces of the proof were sold, as well as 58,834 pieces of the uncirculated version in a plastic capsule and silver sleeve.

== See also ==
- List of Canadian inventions and discoveries
- Jubilee apple
- Wijcik McIntosh

== Works cited ==
- Boyle, Terry (2011). Hidden Ontario: Secrets from Ontario's Past. Dundurn Press. ISBN 978-1-4597-0029-1.
- "Canadian food firsts". Canadian Geographic. January–February 2002. Archived from the original on 24 June 2013.
- CBC News staff (25 August 2011). "Oldest McIntosh apple tree descendant cut down". CBC News.
- Davidson, Alan (2014). The Oxford Companion to Food. Oxford University Press. ISBN 978-0-19-104072-6.
- Ferree, David David Curtis; Warrington, I. Ian J. (2003). Apples: Botany, Production, and Uses. CABI. ISBN 978-0-85199-799-5.
- Fox, Mark (30 June 2010). "McIntosh Given Numismatic Nod". World Coin News. Krause Publications. Archived from the original on 5 June 2015.
- Gollner, Adam Leith (2008). The Fruit Hunters: A Story of Nature, Adventure, Commerce, and Obsession. Charles Scribner's Sons. ISBN 978-1-4165-6561-1.
- Kearney, Mark; Ray, Randy (2002). I Know That Name!: The People Behind Canada's Best Known Brand Names from Elizabeth Arden to Walter Zeller. Dundurn Press. ISBN 978-1-55002-407-4.
- Kipfer, Barbara Ann (2012). The Culinarian: A Kitchen Desk Reference. Houghton Mifflin Harcourt. ISBN 978-0-544-18603-3.
- Linzmayer, Owen W. (2004). Apple Confidential 2.0: The Definitive History of the World's Most Colorful Company. No Starch Press. ISBN 978-1-59327-010-0.
- Noiton, Dominique A.M.; Alspach, Peter A. (September 1996). "Founding Clones, Inbreeding, Coancestry, and Status Number of Modern Apple Cultivars". Journal of the American Society for Horticultural Science. 121 (5): 773–782. doi:10.21273/JASHS.121.5.773.
- Small, Ernest (2009). Top 100 Food Plants. NRC Research Press. ISBN 978-0-660-19858-3.
