= Arkansas Black =

Apple cultivar

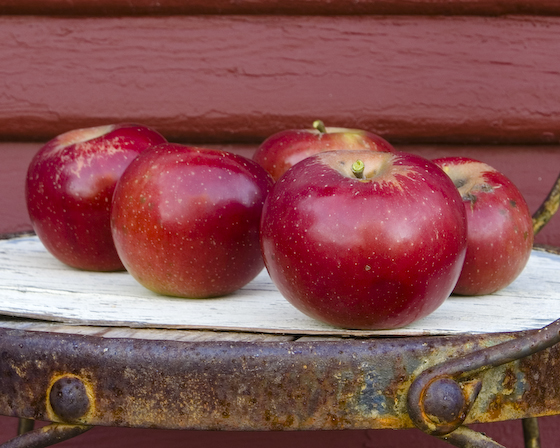
- Species: Malus domestica
- Hybrid parentage: Chance seedling
- Cultivar: Arkansas Black
- Origin: (United States) Benton County, Arkansas, circa 1870

The Arkansas Black is a cultivated variety or cultivar of apple that originated in the late-19th century in Benton County, Arkansas. One of its parents is suspected to be the Winesap. The Arkansas Black is not the same as the cultivar Arkansas or Arkansas Black Twig.

Arkansas Black apples are generally medium-sized with a somewhat flattened shape. They grow darker as they ripen, becoming a very dark red or purplish red in color, especially on the side exposed to the Sun. Arkansas Black is one of the darkest of all apple cultivars, hence the name. A variant of the Huaniu apple, the Black Diamond has an even darker color.

Its yellowish flesh is notably hard and crunchy, with a distinctive aroma. Fairly tart when fresh-picked, the apples mellow with storage. Arkansas Blacks are considered an excellent keeping apple, and can be stored for six months in appropriate conditions.

This cultivar is grown throughout the United States, and can be pollinated by Golden Delicious, Red Delicious, or (fruitless) crabapple trees. The Arkansas Black can be used for snacking and making vinegar.
