= Red Delicious =

Apple cultivar

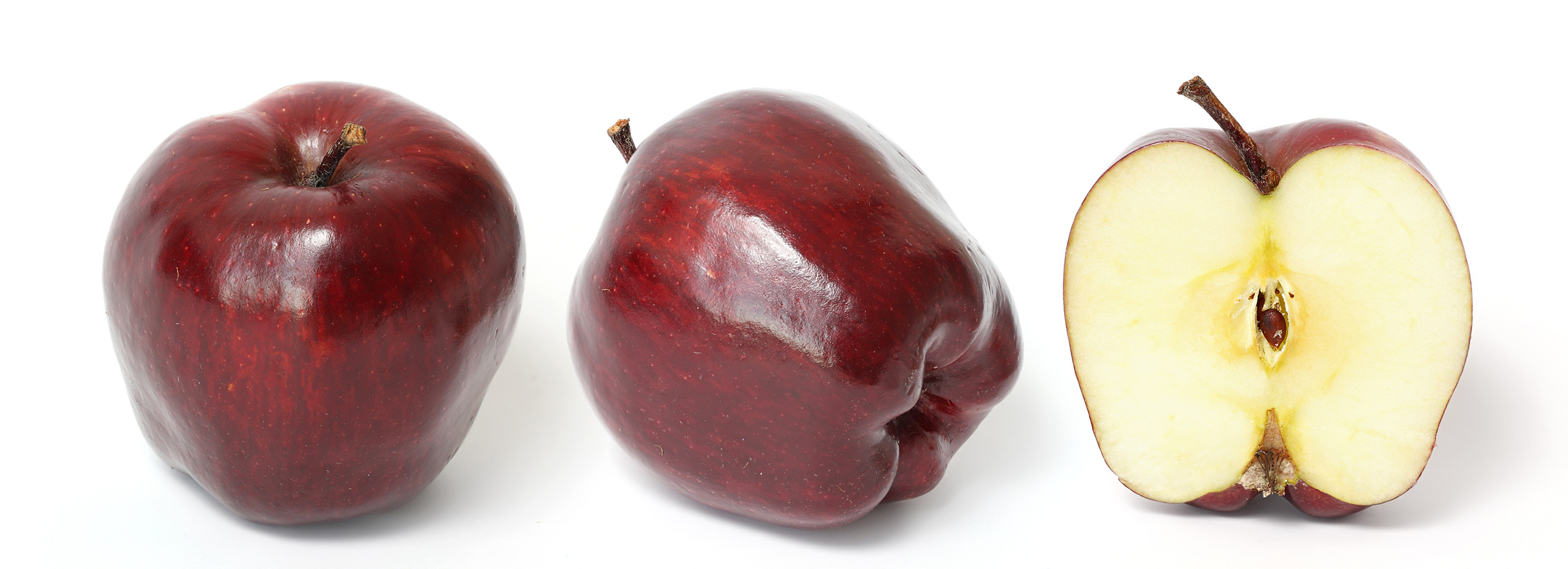
- Species: Malus domestica
- Hybrid parentage: Chance seedling
- Marketing names: Hawkeye; Delicious; Stark Delicious; Red Delicious
- Origin: (United States) Peru, Iowa, 1872

Red Delicious is a variety of apple with a red exterior and sweet taste. Known as "the Reds" in the industry, this variety is the result of a chance seedling. It was first recognized in Madison County, Iowa, United States, in 1872. Despite its name, it is not related to the Golden Delicious.

The Red Delicious is harvested in mid-fall, but is available all year round and is best consumed fresh or in salads. It could also make up part of the blend for apple cider. It has white, tender, crisp, and juicy flesh, with a distinctive flavor.

Over the years, it has been bred to be redder, larger, and more elongated. Today, the name Red Delicious covers more than 300 named cultivars (cultivated varieties). It was the most produced apple cultivar in the United States from 1968 until 2018, when it was surpassed by Gala. It also lost that title in Canada at around the same time. Even so, it remains popular in Mexico and some Asian countries. Its shape is still considered emblematic of apples.

A 1996 study found that clones of the Red Delicious were some of the most commonly used to breed new apple varieties, behind only the McIntosh, Golden Delicious, Jonathan, and Cox's Orange Pippin. Many new varieties developed in the nations of the Pacific Rim have the Red Delicious in their pedigrees.

Pollinating partners of the Red Delicious include the Gala, Ginger Gold, and Golden Delicious.

== Origins ==
The Red Delicious originated at an orchard in 1872 as "a round, blushed yellow fruit of surpassing sweetness" by chance seedling. Stark Nurseries held a competition in 1892 to find an apple to replace the Ben Davis apple.

The winner was a red and yellow striped apple sent by Jesse Hiatt, a farmer in Peru, Iowa, who called it "Hawkeye" in honor of his home state. Stark Nurseries bought the rights from Hiatt, renamed the variety "Stark Delicious", and began propagating it. Another apple tree, later named the Golden Delicious, was also marketed by Stark Nurseries after it was purchased from a farmer in Clay County, West Virginia. In 1914, the 'Delicious' became the 'Red Delicious' as a retronym.

== Popularity ==
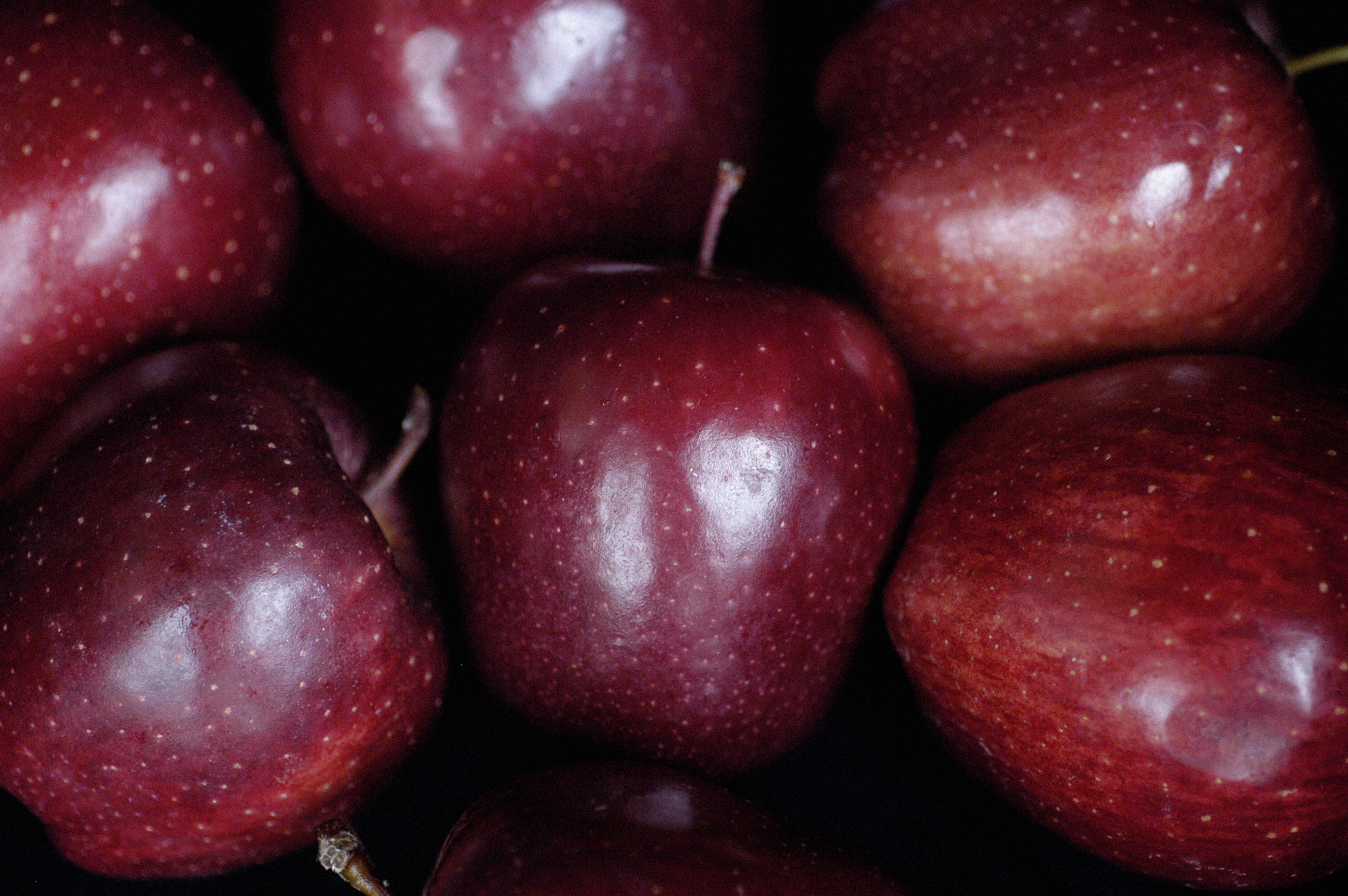
Modern Red Delicious apples tend to be uniformly red. But selection for redder fruit resulted in loss of flavor.

The Red Delicious originally became popular thanks to not just its visual appeal but also its durability in storage, making transportation easy. Starting in the 1950s, changes in grocery buying habits led to consumers prioritizing appearance. "We started eating with our eyes and not our mouths," observed the pomologist and apple historian Tom Burford. As a result, commercial growers increasingly selected for longer storage and cosmetic appeal rather than flavor. Consumers at that time associated redness with ripeness. But the selection of redder fruit caused deselection of flavor, and the genes that produced the yellow stripes on the original fruit were on the same chromosomes as those for the flavor-producing compounds. Breeding for uniformity and long shelf life favored a thicker skin.

While the Red Delicious had enjoyed moderate success in the market place, its popularity only took off in the mid-twentieth century. It became the most popular apple in the United States during the 1940s. Up until the 1970s, there were only a small number of apple varieties available for purchase at American supermarkets; these were the Granny Smith, Golden Delicious, and Red Delicious apples. But according to Tom Burford, it was the Red Delicious that was the most heavily promoted by Washington farmers. By the 1980s, Red Delicious represented three-quarters of the harvest in Washington State. Nevertheless, the selection for beauty and long storage over taste was not popular among consumers. Wholesalers began searching for other apple varieties, such as the Fuji from Japan and the Braeburn and Gala from New Zealand. As these competing cultivars entered supermarkets, demand for the Red Delicious declined. By the 1990s, heavy reliance on the increasingly unpopular Red Delicious had been a factor driving Washington state's apple industry to the brink of collapse. In 2000, President Bill Clinton signed into law a bill bailing out the apple industry, after apple growers had lost $760 million since 1997.

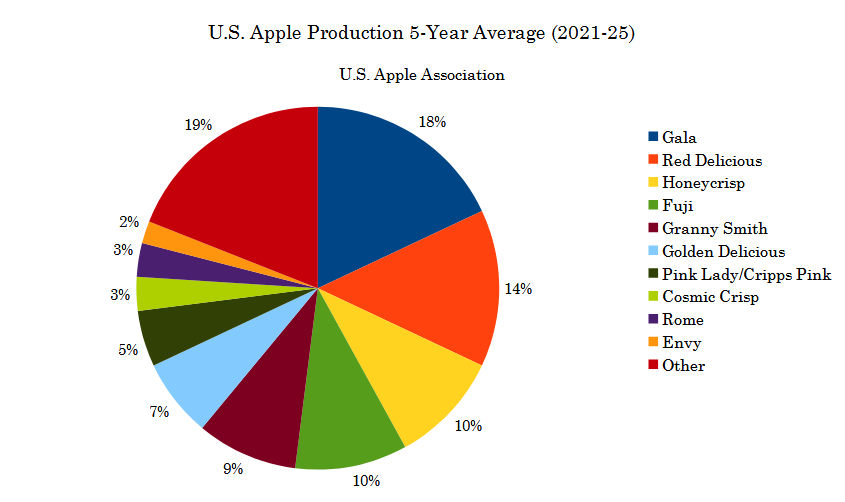
The Red Delicious continues to be the second most produced apple variety in the United States during the first half of the 2020s.

American farmers began to replace the Red Delicious in their orchards with other cultivars such as Gala, Fuji, and Honeycrisp. By 2000, the Red Delicious made up less than one half of the Washington state output, and in 2003, the crop fell to 37% of the state's harvest, which stood at 103 million boxes. Although Red Delicious still remained the single largest variety produced in the state in 2005, others were growing in popularity, notably the Fuji and Gala varieties. By 2014 the Washington Apple Commission was recommending growers plan to export 60% or more of production. In 2018, the Gala overtook the Red Delicious in U.S. sales for the first time. According to the U.S. Apple Association, production of the Gala grew 5.8% in 2018 compared to the previous year, whereas that of the Red Delicious fell 11%. However, exporting the Red Delicious was still a viable option because other countries still had high demand for the apple. In fact, the Red Delicious accounted for around half of all the apples exported by the United States in 2018. However, the COVID-19 pandemic was projected to continue reducing domestic demand for the Red Delicious as many cafeterias and other typical sales points for the apple were closed. By 2021, the Red Delicious accounted for only 15% of the output of Washington state. Despite these challenges, during the mid-2020s, the Red Delicious remained one of the most produced apples in the United States. In 2024, the Red Delicious accounted for 12.3% of the American apple market, behind only the Gala (17%). Washington State, Michigan, and New York are the nation's top producers of this variety. In Oregon, it remains the most produced apple, in terms of the number of 42-pound bushels harvested. However, by this time, most American-harvested Red Delicious apples were for export rather than domestic consumption. Internationally, the top markets for the Red Delicious are Mexico, Canada, Taiwan, Vietnam, and Indonesia.

Meanwhile, in the top apple-growing provinces of Canada (British Columbia, Ontario, and Quebec), farmers have switched to the Ambrosia, Honeycrisp, and Gala. As of the 2020s, almost all of Canada's Red Delicious apples were grown in Quebec and Ontario.

In the European Union, the Red Delicious continues to be one of the most popular apples, taking 6 percent of the regional market, behind only the Golden Delicious and the Gala, as of 2024; there has been some growth in the production of this variety.

== Sports (mutations) ==
Over the years many propagable mutations, or sports, have been identified among Red Delicious apple trees.

=== Patented ===
In addition to those propagated without any patent applications (or cut out because they were seen as inferior), 42 sports have been patented in the United States:

Date	Inventor	Marketed as	Mutated from	Assignee	Habit	Pattern	Earlier	Color	Plant patent number
Apr 3, 1934	Henry Shotwell	Shotwell Delicious	Delicious	C&O	standard	less stripe	2 wk.	3-4 times	US plant patent 90
May 18, 1954	Plough	Royalred^{1805}	Richared	C&O	standard	blush	10 d.	lighter	US plant patent 1278
Aug 23, 1955	Brauns	Red King^{1811}	Starking	Van Well	standard	stripe	2 wk.	more complete	US plant patent 1411
Feb 12, 1957	Bisbee	Starkrimson	Starking	Stark	spur	blush	"earlier"	more uniform	US plant patent 1565
Feb 3, 1959	Frazier & Jenkins		Starking	Elon J. Gilbert	standard	blush	10 d.	brighter	US plant patent 1805
Feb 17, 1959	Hamilton	Chelan Red		Hamilton	standard	blush	2 wk.	darker	US plant patent 1811
Mar 24, 1959	Gilbert	Redspur	Starking	C&O	spur	blush	later	brighter	US plant patent 1822
Feb 23, 1960	Hutchinson	Top Red^{3556}	Shotwell	C&O	standard	striped	2-3 wk.	darker	US plant patent 1916
Apr 5, 1960	Wood	Woods, Starkspur^{2606}	Starking	Stark	spur	striped	1 wk.	deeper	US plant patent 1930
Sep 24, 1963	Gould		Red Delicious	Miller&Miller	standard	blush	"early"	more intense	US plant patent 2285
Aug 11, 1964	Gilbert Miller	Sturdyspur	Starking	Cons. Orch. Co	spur	blush	"early"	dark	US plant patent 2433
Aug 25, 1964	Frank Rypczynski	"Frank", Super Starking^{5569}	Starking	Stark	standard	subdued stripes	30 d.	fuller	US plant patent 2440
Mar 15, 1966	C.L. Cooper, Washington, US	Regal Chelan Spur	Welspur		spur	stripe	10-14d.	more intense	US plant patent 2606
June 4, 1968	Trumbull	Oregon Spur^{4819}	Red King	Van Well	spur	stripe	2 wk.	darker	US plant patent 2816
Dec 23, 1969	Herbert Diede Washington, US	Red Bouquet	Starking	Stark	standard			more intense	US plant patent 2956
Feb 2, 1971	Matson	Stark Earlibrite^{5547}	Ryan Red	Stark	standard	blush	1 month	bright	US plant patent 3025
Mar 2, 1971	Maxam		Starking		standard	blush		deeper	US plant patent 3035
Apr 13, 1971	Norton		Vance		spur		2-3 wk.	brilliant	US plant patent 3040
Feb 19, 1974	Coke	Rose Red	Starking	Rose	spur	blush	from start	dark	US plant patent 3485
May 7, 1974	Pagnelli		Starking	Stark	spur	blush		brighter	US plant patent 3541
May 28, 1974	A.M. Ward, Washington, US	Early Red One^{4839}	Brauns	Van Well	standard	stripe	4 wk.	darker blackish-purple	US plant patent 3556
May 28, 1974	Flanagan		Starking	Stark	spur	stripe	before Topred	brighter, lighter	US plant patent 3557
June 11, 1974	Slusarenko		unknown	Stark	standard	stripe	4 d. before #2440	red	US plant patent 3567
June 25, 1974	Fred Campbell, Washington, US	Red Chief^{3578}	Starkrimson	Hilltop	spur	stripe	"earlier"	deeper, brighter	US plant patent 3578
Apr 13, 1976	A.G. Staniforth, B.C. Canada	Spured Royal Delicious	Royal Delicious	Okanogan Nursery					USPP 3864
May 11, 1976	C.L. Cooper, Washington, US	Starkspur Prime Red	Topred Delicious	Stark	tree smaller than Topred Delicious				USPP 3882
Nov. 29, 1977	Silvers	Silverspur	Hi Early	McCormick	spur	stripe	2 wk. before Hi Early	bright	US plant patent 4159
Jan 30, 1979	Craig		Bright 'N Early		spur	stripe	2 wk.	darker, heavier	US plant patent 4372
Aug 12, 1980	Perleberg	Ace	Starkrimson or Oregon Red		spur	stripe	18 d.	bright but deep	US plant patent 4587
Jan 19, 1982	Garretson		Starking	Carlton	<spur / dwarf	blush		bright	US plant patent 4801
Feb 2, 1982	Green	Oregon Spur II^{6190}	Oregon Spur	Wells & Wade	spur	stripe	10 d.	dark	US plant patent 4819
Apr 20, 1982	Evans et al.	Scarlet Spur^{6190}	Oregon Spur	Van Well	spur	blush	2 wk.	red stem	US plant patent 4839
Nov 9, 1982	Coke&Smith	Super Clone^{4926M}	Starking	McCormick, Bountiful Ridge	spur, dwarfing	stripe	no change, late bloom	light	US plant patent 4926
Nov 13, 1984	Kemp	Top Spur^{5334}	Starkrimson	C&O	spur	stripe	5-7 d.	deeper, brighter	US plant patent 5334
Mar 26, 1985	Hanners	Eve's Delight	Spokane Beauty		stripe			light	US plant patent 5421
May 21, 1985	Jenkins	Jenred,^{5472} Starkspur,^{5472} Ultrastripe^{5472}	Oregon Spur	Stark	spur	stripe	15 d.	more consistent	US plant patent 5472
Sep 3, 1985	Hare	Hared,^{5547} Dixiered,^{5547} Starkspur^{5547}	Oregon Spur	Stark	spur	blush	15-20 d.	dark	US plant patent 5547
Oct 8, 1985	Gonzalez	Rico^{7237}	Sharp Red	Merleley & al.	standard	stripe	20 d.		US plant patent 5569
May 31, 1988	Sandidge	Super Chief	Red Chief	Van Well Nursery	spur	stripe	18 d.	red stem	US plant patent 6190
Mar 28, 1989	J. E. Valle, Washington, US	Vallee Spur^{6702}	Red Chief		spur	blush	2 wk.	dark red with bloom	US plant patent 6702
May 29, 1990	Sali	Sali^{7237}	Redspur		semi-spur	blush	"earliest"	purple tinge	US plant patent 7237
Aug 4, 1992	Arden Winkel, Michigan, US	Earlichief	Redchief	Inter-Plant Patent Marketing	spur	blush	5-10 d.	brighter	US plant patent 7928
Mar 23, 1999	Deutscher	Cumberland Spur^{10,832}	Oregon Spur		spur	blush	10-14 d.	complete	US plant patent 10832
May 4, 2004	Burchinal	Adams Apple, Burchinal Red Delicious^{14,757}	Oregon Spur II		spur	blush	immediately	more uniform, deeper, purple, bloom	US plant patent 14757

In 1977, the application for #4159 noted the "starchy and bland taste of some of the newer varieties".

The plant patent for #4926 promoted the sport as a dwarfing interstock, a dwarfing rootstock for pears, or to produce "crab apple"-sized 'Delicious' apples.

== Descendant cultivars ==
- Ambrosia: Golden Delicious × Starking Delicious (suspected)
- Braeburn: Sturmer Pipin × Red Delicious (a parent of Envy)
- Cameo: Golden Delicious × Red Delicious (suspected)
- Empire: McIntosh × Red Delicious
- Fuji: Ralls Janet × Red Delicious (a parent of Autumn Glory and EverCrisp)
- Kidd's Orange Red: Cox's Orange Pippin × Red Delicious (a parent of Gala, and grandparent of Jazz and Kanzi)
- Melrose: Jonathan × Red Delicious
- Sekai Ichi: Golden Delicious × Red Delicious (suspected)
