= South Tyrolean Apple =

Geographically protected apple

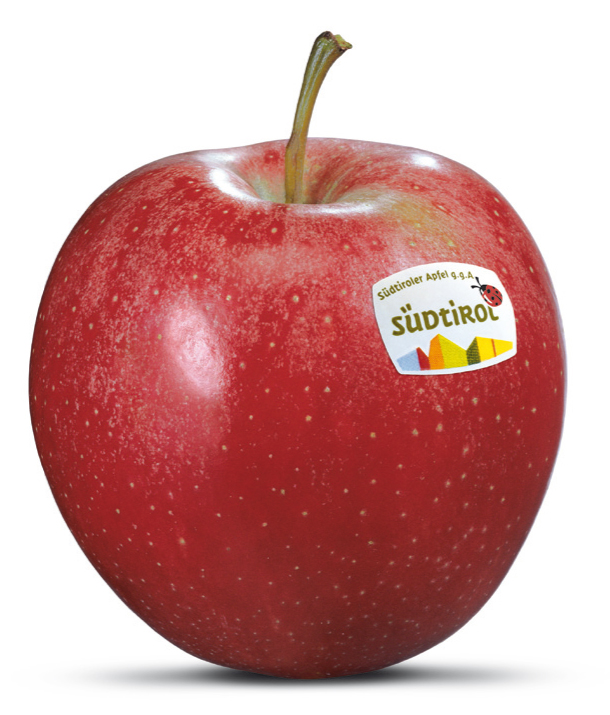
South Tyrolean apples with PGI

South Tyrolean Apple is the English translation of the geographical indication Mela Alto Adige / Südtiroler Apfel, which is registered as a "Protected Geographical Indication" (PGI) in the European Union and the UK. It applies to apples which are cultivated in South Tyrol in a traditional manner. South Tyrol is Europe's largest connected fruit-growing region. Since 2005, eleven of the more than one dozen different apple varieties which are grown under the conditions of the PGI. The GI is used in translated form South Tyrolean Apple PGI by all of South Tyrol's marketing companies for export.

== History ==
The first apple trees evolved in Kazakhstan in central Asia. The apples reached the Greeks via the Silk Road and were finally brought to South Tyrol with the Roman conquests. In the Middle Ages the cultivation of apples was practised mainly in monasteries. They preserved the varieties of apple and knowledge of fruit-growing. For many hundreds of years apple trees were planted around the farmstead for the use of the farmer's family. At this time the South Tyrolean Apple was already being exported north across the alpine passes. The construction of a railway line through the Brenner Pass in 1867 facilitated the export of apples. From 1880 – 1890 South Tyrolean fruit farmers drained water from the bottom of the valley by controlling the River Etsch/Adige and in so doing gained useful cultivation land. The first fruit cooperatives were established at the end of the 19th century. Since then apple cultivation has been of major importance in South Tyrol.

== Apple-producing region ==
With its 18,400 hectares South Tyrol is the largest closed apple-producing region in the EU. With a valley length of approx. 100 km it stretches from Salorno in the South along the Adige valley as far as Mals in Vinschgau Valley. There is a smaller cultivation area in Eisacktal near Natz-Schabs. Apple cultivation takes up about 2.5 percent of the overall area of South Tyrol. With 8,000 family-run farms apple production per unit is very low in South Tyrol. The average farm is between 2.5 and 3 hectares. The annual harvest amounts to approx. 950,000 tonnes of which around 50 percent is marketed in Italy. Germany is the most important export market. The climatic conditions of South Tyrol are ideal for apple cultivation. The Alps protect against cold fronts coming from the North. The fruit gains its special inner and outer quality from the 300 days and more than 2,000 hours of sun each year. The average annual rainfall of 800 mm per square metre provides a basic supply for fruit growing and in dry summer months fruit producers also water their trees.

== Cultivation ==
In South Tyrol both integrated production and organic farming are implemented. 96 percent of fruit producers follow the directives of AGRIOS (working group for integrated fruit growing in South Tyrol) and four percent follow the directives of organic cultivation.

=== Integrated cultivation ===
Integrated cultivation uses nature's powers of resistance, preserves useful insects and furthers their number by targeted ecological measures. To this end, AGRIOS of South Tyrol has defined specific regulations. The approved pesticides may only be used when the economic damage threshold has been reached. Herbicides that could damage the soil are prohibited and fertilisation is effected in accordance with the results of soil analyses.

=== Organic cultivation ===
South Tyrol—today Europe's largest organic apple supplier—paved the way for organic apple cultivation in the 1980s. Two trends have evolved since then:

- Organic-biological cultivation: This method is in harmony with nature and rejects the use of chemical synthetic pesticides and fertilisers
- Bio-dynamic cultivation: according to the teachings of Rudolf Steiner. Each procedure is tested to see whether it fits into the integrated ecosystem and the influence of the stars is observed.

=== Protected Geographical Indication ===
Since 2005, the "Protected Geographical Indication" (PGI) registration applies to 11 different varieties of South Tyrolean apples in the EU and the UK. This geographical indication guarantees the product's quality and originality as well as the well-established manufacturing processes involved. The link between the creation and processing of the apple in its regional provenance of South Tyrol has also been documented. South Tyrolean apples must comply with specific production regulations and a strict control system.

South Tyrolean apples with PGI

- Golden Delicious
- Gala
- Red Delicious
- Braeburn
- Fuji
- Granny Smith
- Morgenduft
- Jonagold
- Winesap
- Idared
- Elstar
