= Aurora Golden Gala =

Apple cultivar

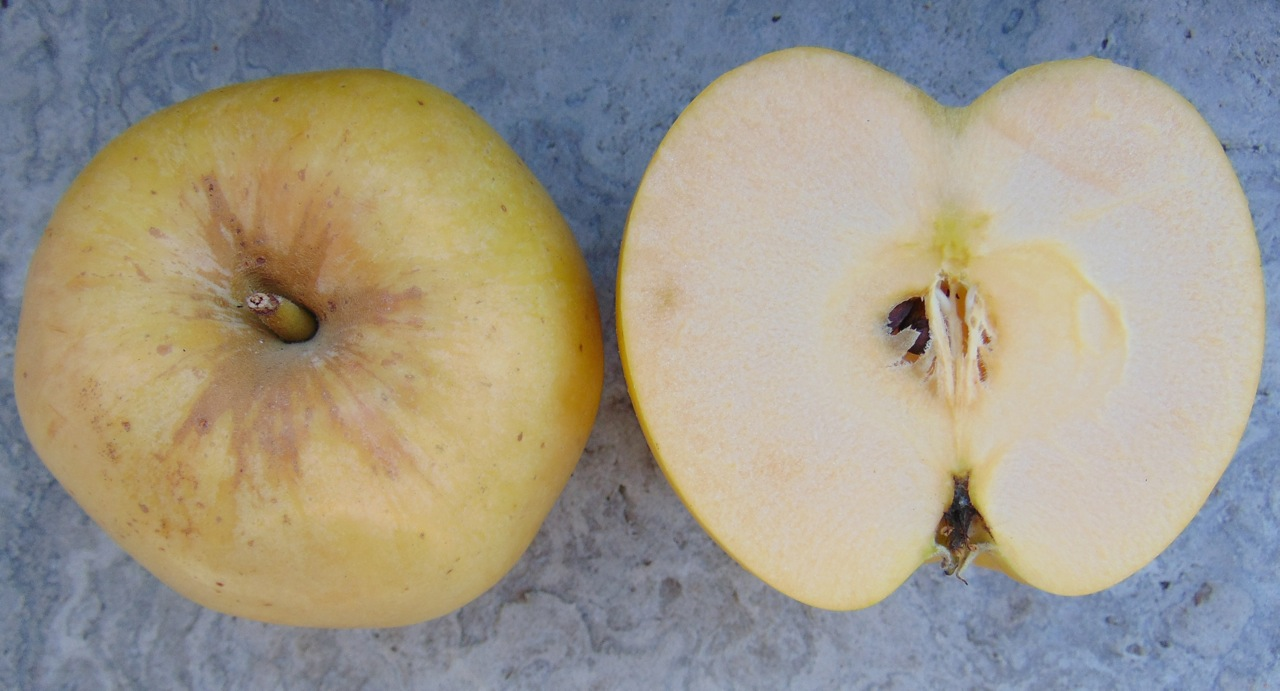
- Species: Malus domestica
- Hybrid parentage: Splendour × Gala
- Cultivar: 8S6923
- Marketing names: Aurora Golden Gala
- Origin: (Canada) Summerland, British Columbia

Aurora Golden Gala, originally named 8S6923, is cultivated variety or cultivar of apple that is a cross between the Splendour and Gala. It was named in 2003 in a Canada-wide "Name the Apple" contest. Aurora Golden Gala is a yellow dessert apple. It is harvested mid-season. The fruit are medium in size, very crisp, juicy, aromatic, sweet, and they store well.

Currently Aurora Golden Gala is only available in Canada and the United States. The cultivar was made at the Pacific Agri-Food Research Centre (PARC), Summerland, BC.
