= Summerfree =

Apple cultivar

Malus domestica 'Summerfree'
- Hybrid parentage: 'PRI 1956-6 × ' Ed Gould Golden '
- Cultivar: 'Summerfree'
- Origin: Italy 1996 CRAFRU-Roma

The 'Summerfree' is an apple cultivar first developed in Italy in the 1990s by crossing 'PRI 1956-6' and 'Ed Gould Golden' apples. Resistant to apple scab, it has a spreading habit with moderate vigor, the fruit are large with an average weight of 175 g, the skin is smooth, it ripens one to two months before 'Gala', and it has good storage ability.
