= South Tyrol quality mark =

Regional collective trademark

The quality mark "South Tyrol" is a regional collective trademark with geographical indication, that stands for a certified quality in special agricultural products. It guarantees the origin from South Tyrol and a higher quality than the standard requires. Independent and certified authorities check the adherence to the quality requirements.

== History ==
In 1976 the trademark "South Tyrol" was introduced and it was the first seal of quality in Europe. At the beginning it was applied to apples and wine but then it has been extended to other products since then. In 2005 the brand "Quality Südtirol" was launched. Products with the quality seal guarantee a certified quality from South Tyrol.

== The benefits ==
The mark of quality serves the consumer as a sign. All the products with the South Tyrol quality seal guarantee:

- South Tyrolean origin
- Traditional production methods
- Quality beyond that required by the legal standard
- Compliance with strict quality requirements
- Periodical quality-control checks by certified, independent authorities

== Legal framework ==
The seal of quality meets the strict requirements of EU law and was approved by the European Commission in 2005. It's ruled by the provincial law Nr. 12/2005. The bearer and owner of the mark of quality is the Autonomous Province of Bolzano.

== Controls ==
The seal "Quality Südtirol" may be used to label only specific agricultural products and food which are compliant with the rules and the strict quality criteria established in the specifications. Producers receive regular visits from independent inspectors, who control the adherence to the specifications and respect of the rules.

== Groups of products ==
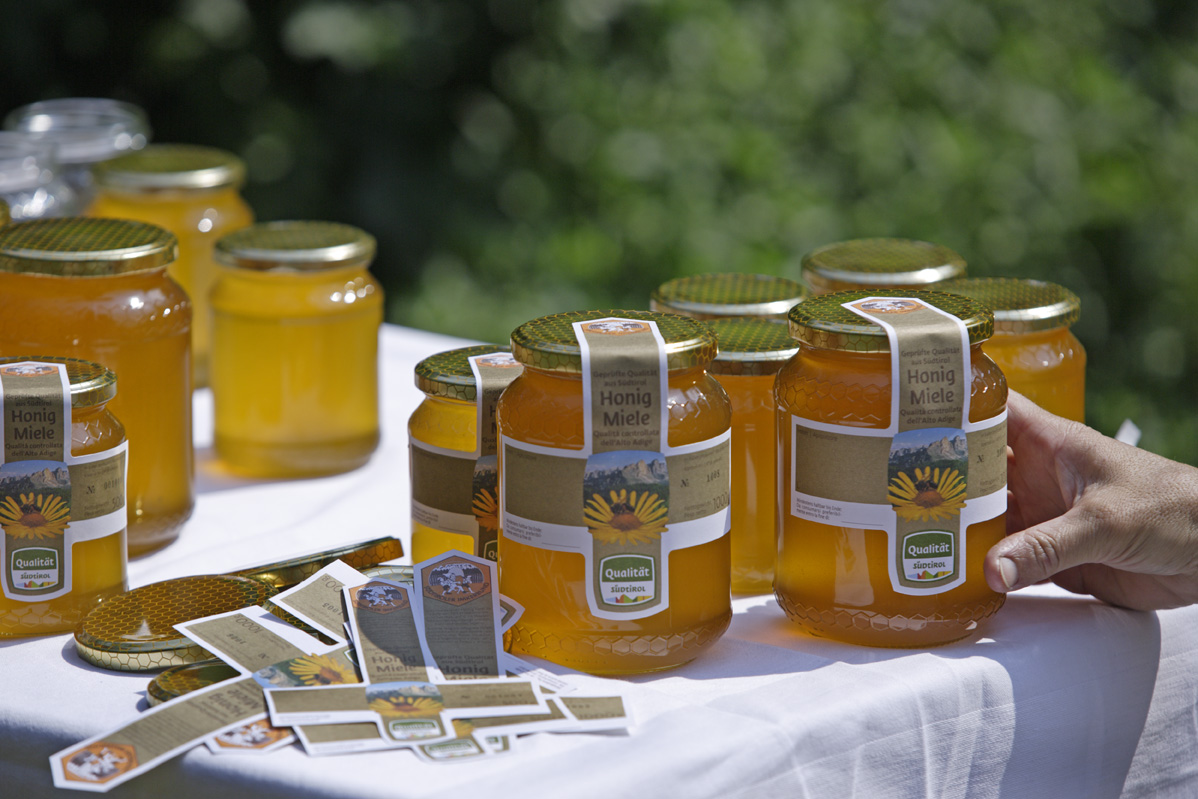
South Tyrolean honey with quality mark South Tyrol

Nowadays 16 products, or better, product groups are allowed to use the South Tyrolean mark of quality:

- Apple juice
- Apple strudel
- Beef
- Beer
- Berries
- Bread
- Cherries
- Dried fruit
- Dumplings
- Eggs
- Grappa
- Herbs
- Honey
- Jam
- Milk
- Vegetables
