= Telstar (apple) =

Apple cultivar

'Telstar'
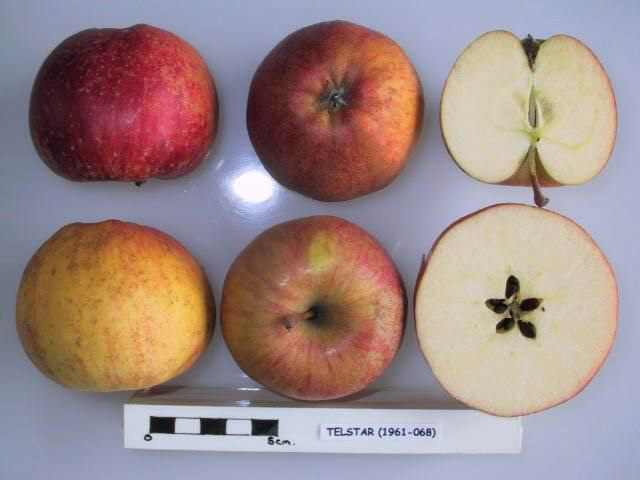
- Hybrid parentage: 'Golden Delicious' x 'Kidd's Orange Red'
- Cultivar: 'Telstar'
- Origin: New Zealand, 1934

'Telstar' is a cultivar of domesticated apple that originated in Greytown, Wairarapa, New Zealand. It has the same parentage as the 'Gala'.
