= Stayman (apple) =

Apple cultivar

Malus domestica 'Stayman'
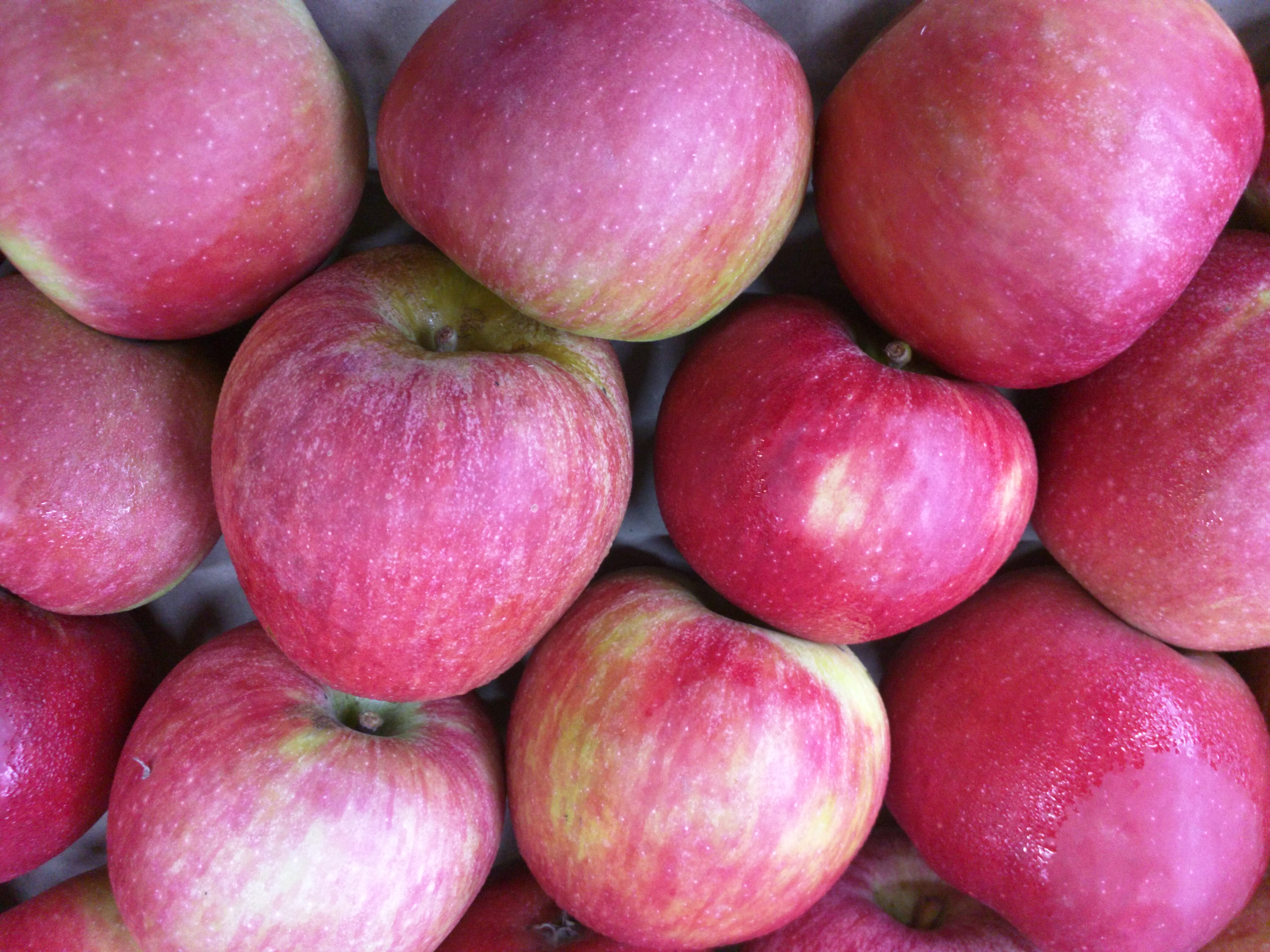
- Cultivar: 'Stayman'
- Origin: Leavenworth County, Kansas, USA

A 'Stayman' (or 'Stayman Winesap') is a triploid apple cultivar developed in 1866 by Joseph Stayman of Leavenworth County, Kansas; it was sold by nurseries from 1895. 'Stayman' apples remain a locally popular cultivar of apples where grown.

== Characteristics ==
'Stayman' is a medium-sized, roundish-conic apple with a thick, greenish-yellow skin covered almost entirely with a deep red blush, darker red stripes, and russet dots. The stem cavity often shows heavy russetting. Firm, tender, finely textured, juicy, crisp, and yellowish-green, the flesh is tart and spicy. They keep very well, and are used primarily as dessert apples, but also make a fine addition to blended cider.
