= Sciros =

Apple cultivar

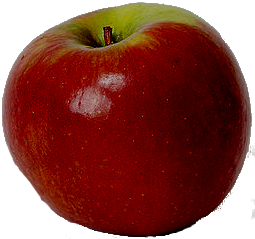
- Genus: Malus
- Species: Malus pumila
- Hybrid parentage: 'Gala' × 'Splendour'
- Cultivar: 'Sciros'
- Marketing names: Pacific Rose™
- Origin: New Zealand

Sciros (or Pacific Rose) is a cultivar of domesticated apple. This apple is mostly sweet with very little acidity, often compared to the 'Fuji' apple for taste, and keeps very well in storage. According to Orange Pippin it is an attractive new late-season high-quality dessert apple, a hybrid between 'Gala' and 'Splendour' apples, mostly resembling the latter.

Pacific Rose is a trademark administered by ENZA, the New Zealand Apple and Pear Marketing Board. The licensing arrangement for this apple has been contentious, with Chilean apples marketed without approval.
