= Harrison Cider Apple =

Apple cultivar

'Harrison' apple
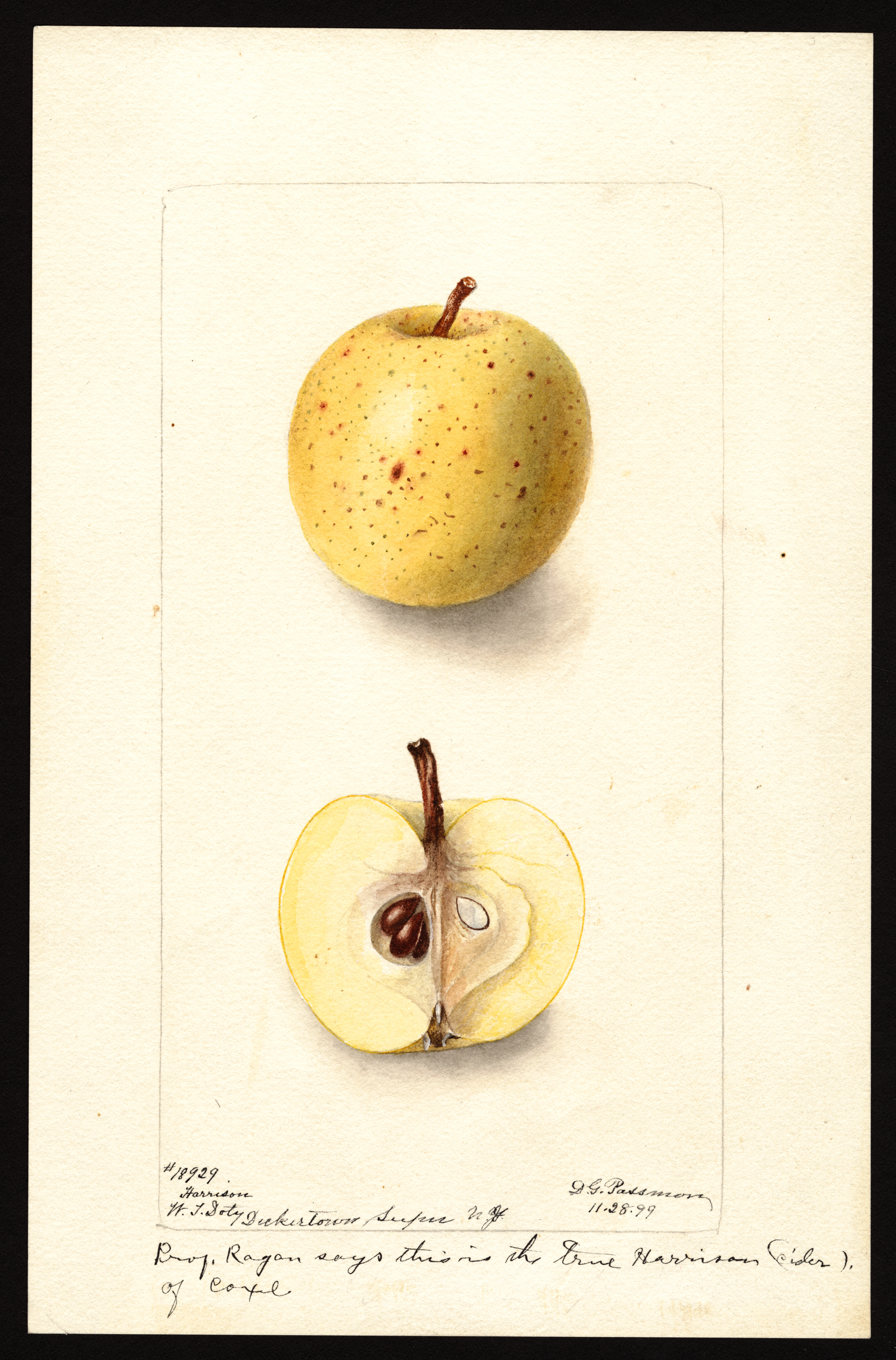
- Genus: Malus
- Species: Malus domestica
- Cultivar: 'Harrison'

The Harrison cider apple is one of the most famous 18th-century American cider apples, primarily used for the production of apple cider. Grown in New Jersey before and after the American Revolution, it fell out of favor by the 20th century. The Harrison cider apple was considered lost until it was recovered in Livingston, New Jersey at an old cider mill in September 1976.

== Historical description ==
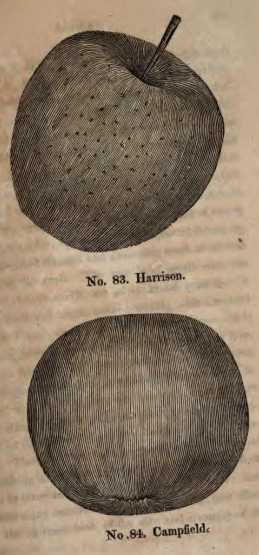
Illustration of Harrison and Campfield cider apples

William Coxe, the first American to publish an illustrated book on the already enormous variety of fruits being grown in North America following the American Revolution, described the Harrison Cider Apple in 1817:

This is the most celebrated of the cider apples of Newark in New-Jersey: it is cultivated in high perfection, and to a great extent in that neighbourhood, particularly on the Orange mountain; the shape is rather long, and pointed towards the crown - the stalk long; hence often called the long stem - the ends are deeply hollowed; the skin is yellow, with many black spots, which gives a rough-ness to the touch: the flesh is rich, yellow, firm and tough; the taste pleasant and sprightly, but rather dry - it produces a high coloured, rich, and sweet cider of great strength, commanding a high price in New York, frequently ten dollars and upwards per barrel when fined for bottling. The trees are certain bearers; the apples fall about the first of November; they are below middling size, and remarkably free from rot; ripen at that time, but will keep well when housed. The tree is of strong and vigorous growth, throwing out numerous suckers from the limbs- the wood is hard... it obtained its name from a family in Essex County New-Jersey, where it originated, and is very extensively cultivated.

The breeding stock for apples, pears, cherries, plums, and peaches that has become the source of contemporary pome fruits in North America was set in place and fully described in Coxe's book. While most of these fruit varieties or their parents arrived from Europe, Coxe advocated growing the new American varieties derived from the European ones, since they showed themselves to be better adapted to the American climate and soils.

When S.A. Beach wrote "The Apples of New York" in 1905, no mention of the Harrison was made, as it had slipped into obsolescence by the 20th century. The chief cause of this obsolescence was the growing momentum of the temperance movement throughout the United States, beginning in the 1820s.

== Contemporary history ==
In September 1976, a fruit variety collector from Vermont went in search of the Harrison and Campfield Cider Apples in the neighborhood of Orange Mountain in Essex County, New Jersey that Coxe had written about in 1817. On September 25, he discovered an old cider mill in Livingston, New Jersey (Nettie Ochs Cider Mill on Old Short Hills Road, no longer in existence). The owner had a 'Harrison' apple tree in his backyard, which, according to the owner, had been planted by his grandfather at the turn of the century. This tree was about to be cut down to make room for an expanding vegetable garden; and it was cut down less than one week later. The tree was full of small yellow apples matching Coxe's description. The suckers Coxe had described were also present. Scions were cut and stored for the winter. In the spring of 1977, dozens of Alnarp #2 seedling rootstocks were topworked with the 'Harrison' cider apple.

In 1980, the recent recovery of the 'Harrison' and 'Campfield' cider apples in Livingston and Roseland, New Jersey was shared with Lew Nichols and Annie Proulx in Vershire, Vermont.

In the fall of 1992, trees, fruit, and scions of the Harrison Cider Apple, from the 1976 Livingston, New Jersey discovery, were sent from Vermont to Thomas Burford of Virginia, a respected nurseryman and expert on heirloom apples.

Subsequently, the Harrison Cider Apple has become widely available. Ironbound Hard Cider worked with Tom Burford to bring the Harrison cider apple back to commercial scale in New Jersey. The cidery uses the Harrison to produce modern versions of three Colonial-era products (Newark Cider, Cider Royal, and pét-nat sparkling cider) on its 108-acre farm in Asbury, New Jersey, about 50 miles west of Newark.
