= Gala (apple) =

Apple cultivar

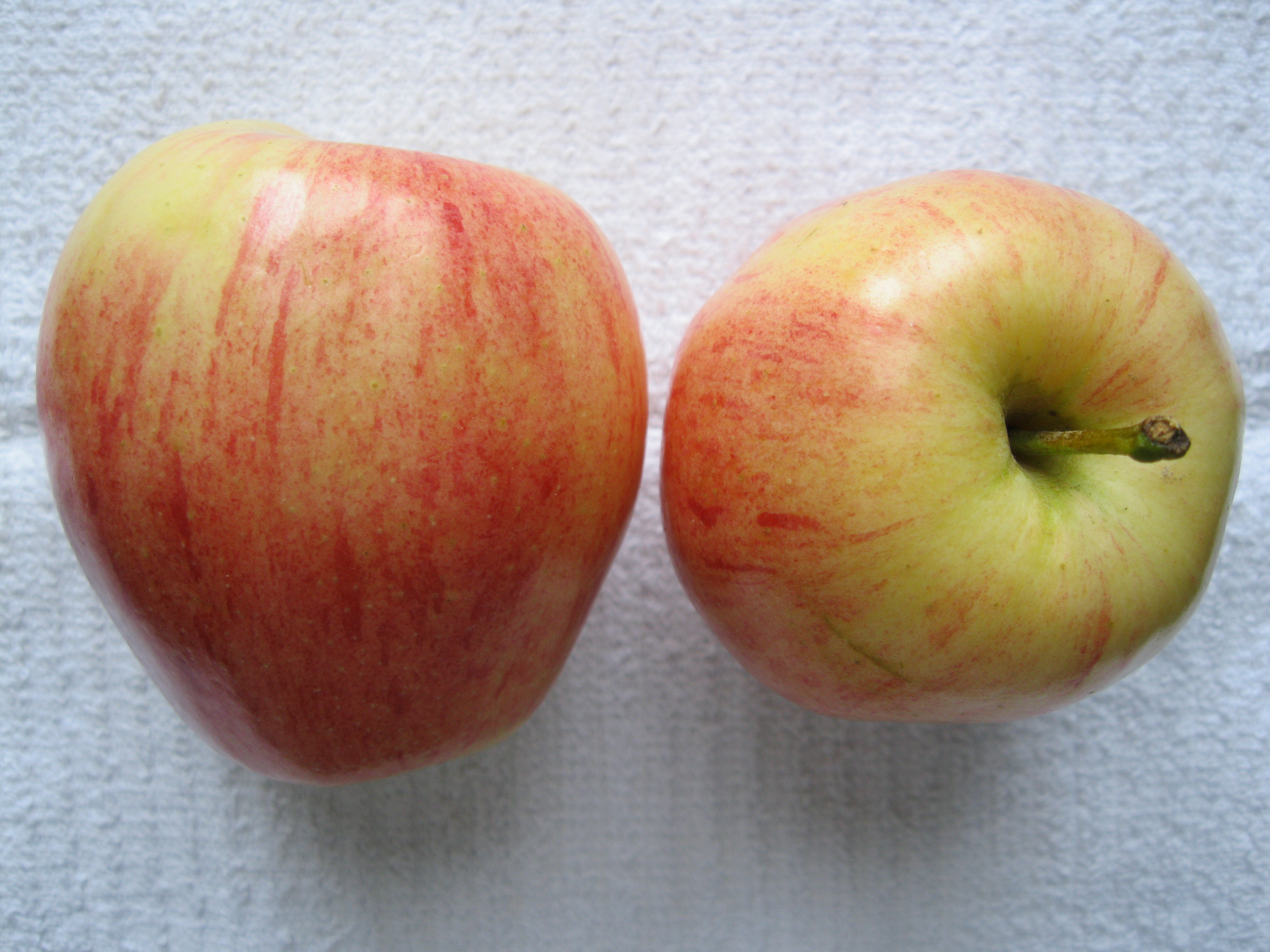
- Species: Malus domestica
- Hybrid parentage: Kidd's Orange Red × Golden Delicious
- Cultivar: Gala
- Breeder: James Hutton Kidd
- Origin: (New Zealand) Greytown, 1939

Gala is an apple cultivar with a sweet, mild flavor, a crisp but not hard texture, and a striped or mottled orange or reddish appearance. Originating from New Zealand in the 1930s, similar to most named apples it is clonally propagated. Easy to grow, the Gala is one of the top commercial apple varieties today and one of the most popular in North America.

== Appearance and flavor ==
Gala apples are non-uniform in color, usually vertically striped or mottled, with an overall orange color. They have creamy white flesh, which is sweet, fine textured, and aromatic. In addition to being eaten raw and cooked they are especially suitable for creating sauces.

- Density 0.86 g/cc
- Sugar 13.5%
- Acidity 4.2 grams/liter
- Vitamin C 0–5 mg / 100 gram

Typical size distribution
55–60 mm	60–65 mm	65–70 mm	70–75 mm	75–80 mm	80–85 mm
1%	6%	12%	40%	38%	3%

== History ==
The first Gala apple tree was one of many seedlings resulting from a cross between a Golden Delicious and a Kidd's Orange Red planted in Greytown, Wairarapa, New Zealand in the 1930s by orchardist J.H. Kidd. Selected in 1939, introduced in 1960. Donald W. McKenzie, an employee of Stark Bros Nursery, obtained a US plant patent for the cultivar on October 15, 1974. By the early twenty-first century, it has become one of the most popular apple varieties worldwide; productions continue to grow, as of the 2020s.

It is a relatively new introduction to the UK, first planted in commercial volumes during the 1980s. The variety now represents about 20% of the total volume of the commercial production of eating apples grown in the UK, often replacing Cox's Orange Pippin.

During the 2000s the provincial government of Nova Scotia, Canada, subsidized apple producers to replace older trees, mainly the McIntosh, with newer higher-return varieties of apples, including the Gala. Elsewhere in Canada, apple orchardists made the switch as well. By the 2020s, the Gala has become one of the top apple varieties in Canada, alongside the Ambrosia and Honeycrisp. Most Canadian Gala apples are grown in Ontario and British Columbia. The most common strains or sports are the Imperial and Royal Gala.

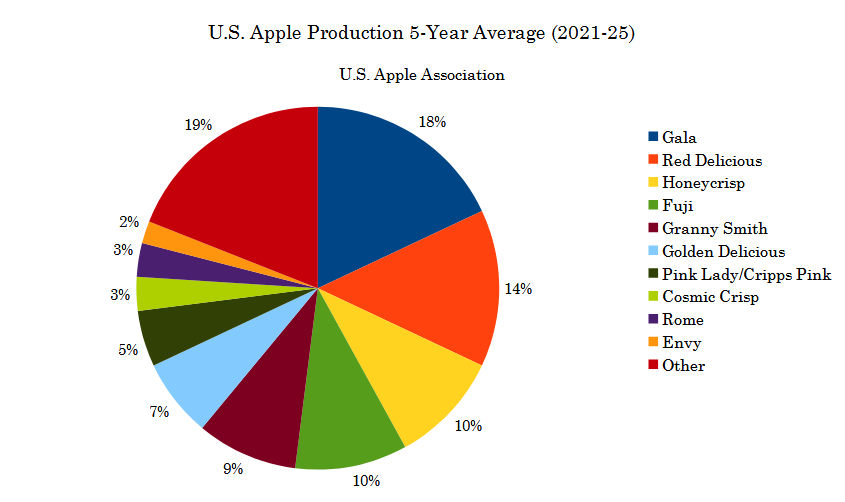
The Gala is the most produced apple variety in the United States during the first half of the 2020s.

During the 1980s, American wholesalers began searching for new apple varieties, and one they picked was the Gala. In 2018, the Gala surpassed Red Delicious as the apple cultivar with the highest production in the United States, according to the US Apple Association. It was the first time in over 50 years that any cultivar was produced more than Red Delicious. By 2024, the Gala accounted for 17% of sales in the United States, more than any other apple. The majority of American Gala apples are harvested in Washington State, Michigan, and New York State.

In Brazil, the Gala and Fuji together commanded 95 percent of the apple market in the middle 2020s.

=== Sports (mutations) ===
Many sports of Gala have been selected, mostly for increased red color, including the popular Royal Gala. The original cultivar produced fruit with orange stripes and a partial orange blush over a yellow background. Since then, several un-patented sports have been recognized. Additionally, more than twenty sports have received US plant patents:

Date	"Inventor"	Marketed as	Mutated from	Assignee	Habit	Pattern	Earlier	Color	Plant patent number
Feb 20, 2013	W. Fulford, New Zealand	Regal Gala (Fulford Gala, Gala Must)	Gala					reddish orange blush over a yellow ground	USPP 3309
Oct 15, 1974	McKenzie	Gala	–	Stark	standard	partial blush	–	yellow	US plant patent 3637
Oct 4, 1977	H.W. Ten Hove, New Zealand	Royal Gala, Tenroy	Gala^{3637}	Stark	standard	stripe	–	red	US plant patent 4121
May 10, 1988	John Creech, US	Scarlet Gala	Kidd's D-8^{3637}	C & 0	standard	blush	–	scarlet	US plant patent 6172
Aug 1, 1989	K.W. Kiddle, New Zealand	Galaxy	Tenroy^{4121}	Stark	standard	stripe	earlier	intense red	US plant patent 6955
Dec 18, 1990	Cooper	Treco Spur Red Gala No. 42, Regal	Auvil	Oregon Rootstock	spur	stripe	–	red	US plant patent 7396
Jul 16, 1991	Fulford	Fulford	Kidd^{3637}		standard	blush	–	bright red	US plant patent 7589
Mar 1, 1994	Olsen	Obrogala, UltraRed	Tenroy^{4121}	Stark	standard	stripe	2–4 days	redder	US plant patent 8621
Apr 5, 1994	Waliser, US	Waliser Gala	Tenroy^{4121}	Waliser	standard	stripe	10 days	bright red	US plant patent 8673
May 10, 1994	Hill	Applewaites	Kidd's^{3637}		standard	blush	2–3 days	more complete red	US plant patent 8720
Nov 5, 1996	Olsen	Olsentwo Gala, Pacific Gala	Royal Gala^{4121}		standard	stripe	5–10 days	distinguishably different	US plant patent 9681
Sep 2, 1997	Paul Brookfield, New Zealand	Baigent	Royal Gala^{4121}	Brookfield	standard	stripe	extremely early	bright red	US plant patent 10016
Nov 11, 1997	Gale	Gale Gala	Royal Gala^{4121}	Van Well, US	standard	stripe	3 weeks	more complete	US plant patent 10114
Jun 23, 1998	Tina Fackler, US	Big Red Gala	Kidd's^{3637}	Protree	standard	stripe	–	same	US plant patent 10458
Mar 30, 1999	Simmons	Simmons	Imperial	Peace Valley	standard	stripe	21 days	brighter red	US plant patent 10840
Jan 18, 2000	Stiekema	Stiekema 1	Obragala^{8621}		standard	blush	–	red	US plant patent 11182
Apr 11, 2000	McSpadden, Jr	Caitlin	Tenroy^{4121}	Stark	standard	stripe	"earlier"	–	US plant patent 11348
Aug 13, 2002	Bob Black, US	Harry Black Gala (Autumn Gala)	Kidd's^{3637}	International Plant Management	standard	stripe	5 wk. later	–	US plant patent 12842
Apr 29, 2003	Banning	Banning Gala	Imperial		standard	stripe	–	intense red blush, darker stripe	US plant patent 13753
Jan 6, 2004	Smith	Smith gala	Tenroy^{4121}		standard	stripe	–	yellow	US plant patent 14448
May 4, 2004	Weaver	Weaver	Fulford^{7589}	Adams County Nursery	more compact	blush	–	bright red	US plant patent 14752
Jan 4, 2005	Ligonniere	Dalitoga	Imperial	SNC Elaris	standard	stripe	3 wk.	yellow	US plant patent 15465
Aug 15, 2006	Burkitt	Burkitt Gala	Tenroy^{4121}	BMA Trust	standard	stripe	10 d.	completely red	US plant patent 17013
Feb 26, 2008	McDonald	El Niño	Royal^{4121}		standard	intense dark red stripe		bright red	US plant patent 18512
Jul 8, 2008	McLaughlin	McLaughlin Gala, Blondee	Kidd's^{3637}		standard	no striping or blush	4—6 d.	yellow	US plant patent 19007
Dec 30, 2008	G. E. Fankhauser, Australia	Alvnia	Gala	Fankhauser	standard	stripes	"earlier"	red, > 95A% coverage	US plant patent 19604
Apr 14, 2009	A. Richard, France	Galaval	Galaxy Gala^{6955}	Pepinieres du Valois	standard	blush	–	intense dark purple brown	US plant patent 19909
Sept 28, 2010	M. Julien, France	Jugala	Mitchgla Gala				5 d.		USPP 21315
Aug 14, 2012	S. Buck, New Zealand	Premier Star	Imperial Gala						USPP 22949
Jul 22, 2014	R. Wyle, US	Foxtrot	Tenroy Gala				earlier ripening	more intensely red	USPP 24664
Apr 7, 2015	S. Perathoner, Italy	Gala Parathoner	Mitchgla Gala			stripes		light and dark stripes 95–100%	USPP 25407
Jan 24, 2017	A. Gruber-Genetti, Italy	Gala Schnico Red	Gala Schnitzer Scinga					100% dark red	USPP 27577
May 9, 2017	A. Defrancesschi, Italy	Gala 2013	Gala					100% purple-red	USPP 27978
Jan 23, 2018	L. Fabre, France	Galafab(Gala Star)	Gala					Red 90–100%	USPP 28885
Dec 25, 2018	Brisset, France	Gala Surf	Gala					Very dark purple red	USPP 30009
May 21, 2019	J. Braun, Italy	GalaMic	Gala					Deep purple	USPP 30512

==== Unpatented varieties ====
Unpatented varieties
Name	mutated from	year and country
Auvil		
Imperial Gala		
Ultima Gala (Banning)	Imperial Gala	1997 US

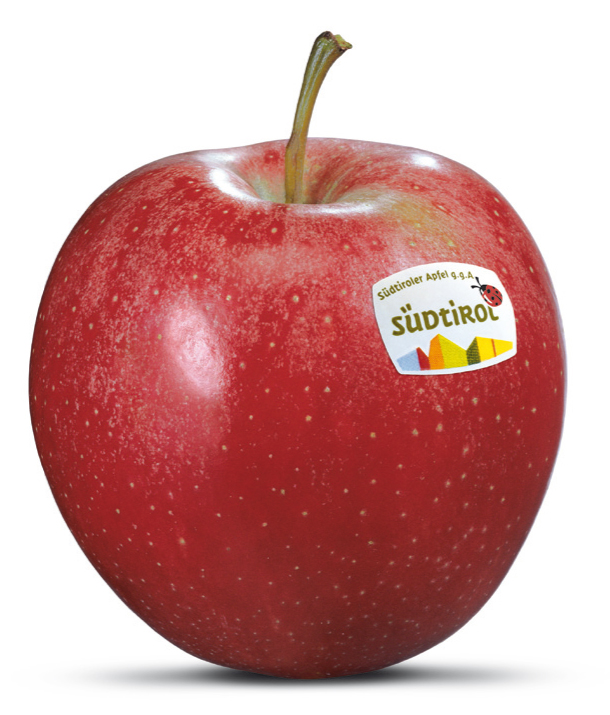
Gala apple from South Tyrol, Italy, with protected-origin (PDO) sticker.

=== Descendant cultivars ===
Name	Parentage	Cross made	Introduced	Origin
Aurora Golden Gala	Splendour × Gala	1981		Canada
Bravo	Cripps Red × Royal Gala	1992		Australia
Delfloga	(Royal Gala × Florina)	?	?	
Envy (Scilate)	(Royal Gala × Braeburn)	1985		New Zealand
Gaia	Gala × A3-7			Italy
Galarina	Gala × Florina Querina	1978		France
Jazz (Scifresh)	Braeburn × Royal Gala	1985	?	New Zealand
Nicoter (Kanzi)	(Gala × Braeburn)			Belgium
Modi	Gala × Liberty	1992		Italy
Monalisa	Gala × Malus 4			Brazil
Newson	Gala × Hawkes Bay Red Delicious	1983		Canada
Nicola	Splendour × Gala	1981		Canada
Pink Luster	Gala × Honeycrisp	1997	2020	USA
Sciros (Pacific Rose)	(Splendor × Gala)			
Rubens (Civni)	Elstar × Gala			Italy
Sweetie ('PremA280')				
Salish	Splendour × Gala	1981	1997	Canada

== Season ==
Gala apples are grown from May through September in the northern hemisphere, but, like most apples, are available almost all year through the use of cold storage and controlled atmosphere storage. Australian Gala are available from late January. California fruit is available until October. While the season usually lasts only 9 or 10 months, they are able to last all year round. However, due to some apples continuing to be grown in some orchards, and the fact that they can be refrigerated for some months leads to the availability of the Gala apple year-round in some Australian markets. These usually taste different (slightly less sweet) from those in season. The UK season begins in late summer (August). Storage makes the UK fruit available nearly year-round as with fruit from other origins.

== Royal Gala sport ==
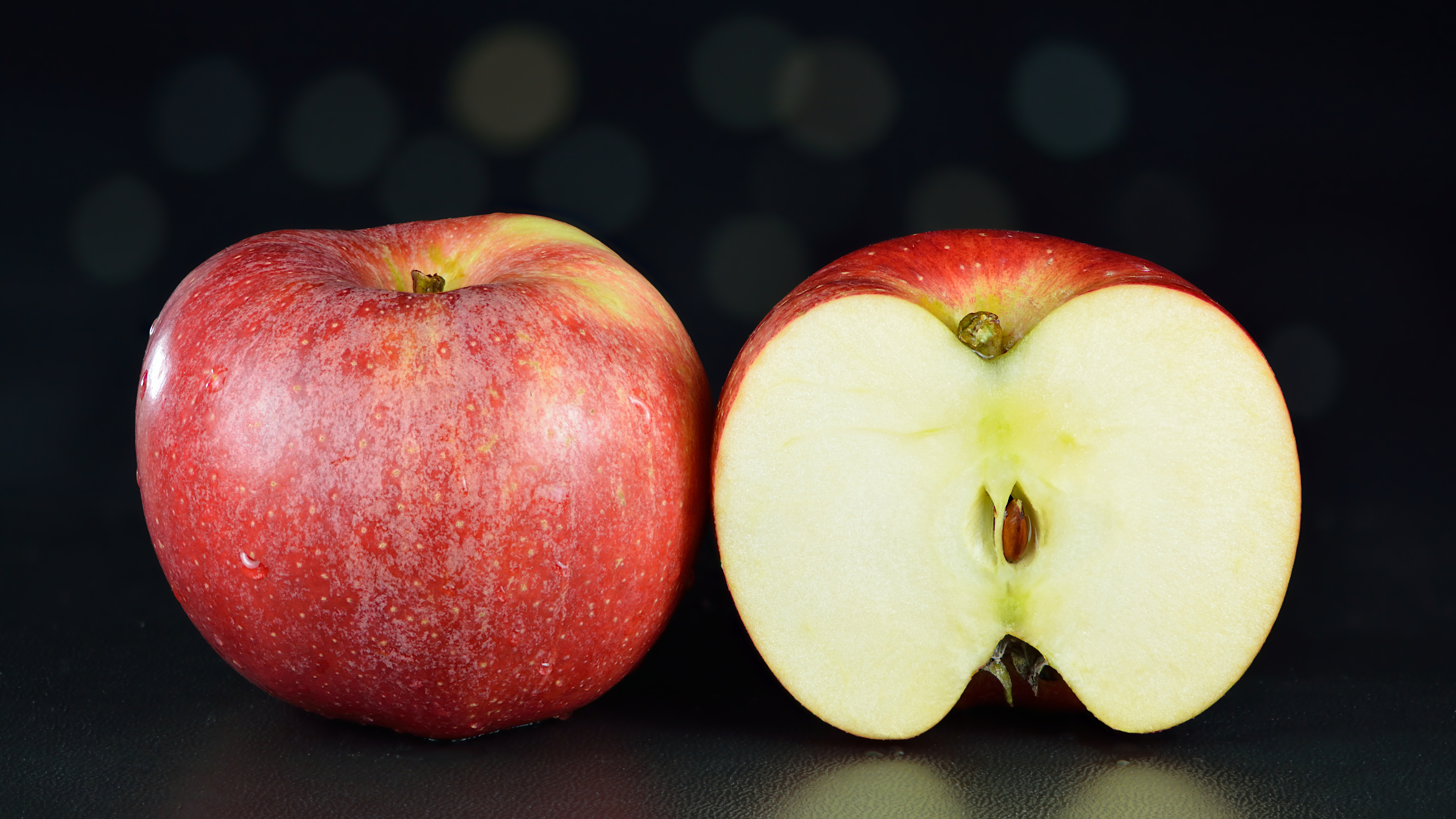
'Royal Gala' cultivar

Royal Gala is a Gala sport, patented by Stark in 1977, which produces redder fruits than the original cultivar. It is a pink-red dessert apple and is therefore usually eaten fresh. Royal Galas are usually harvested in early to late February in the Southern Hemisphere. In New Zealand, the pinker original Gala has almost disappeared as a commercial apple in favor of the darker-skinned Royal Gala.
