= Kidd's Orange Red =

Apple cultivar

- Hybrid parentage: Cox's Orange Pippin x Red Delicious
- Cultivar: Kidd's Orange Red
- Origin: (New Zealand) Greytown, Wairarapa, 1924

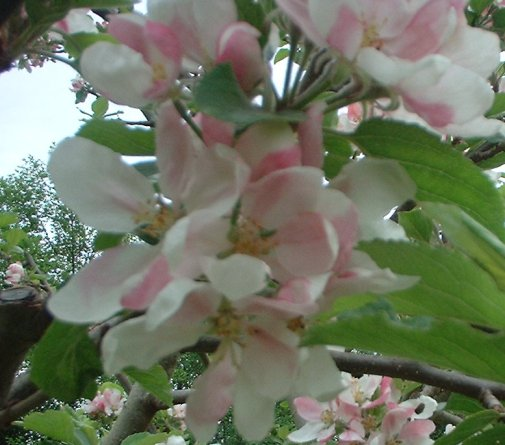
Blossom of the Kidd's Orange Red tree

Kidd's Orange Red is a cultivar of domesticated apple that was developed in Greytown, Wairarapa, New Zealand. It is also known as the Delco apple. The Kidd's Orange Red creamy white flesh, crisp and juicy texture, and sweet and aromatic flavor.

The Captain Kidd apple is a sport from Kidd's Orange Red with fruit that have a stronger red pigment.

This crop bears fruit reliably but not heavily, making less commercially attractive. It is a parent of Gala and Telstar apple cultivars.
