= Stark Brothers Nurseries and Orchards =

US horticultural company

Stark Bro's Nurseries & Orchards Co.
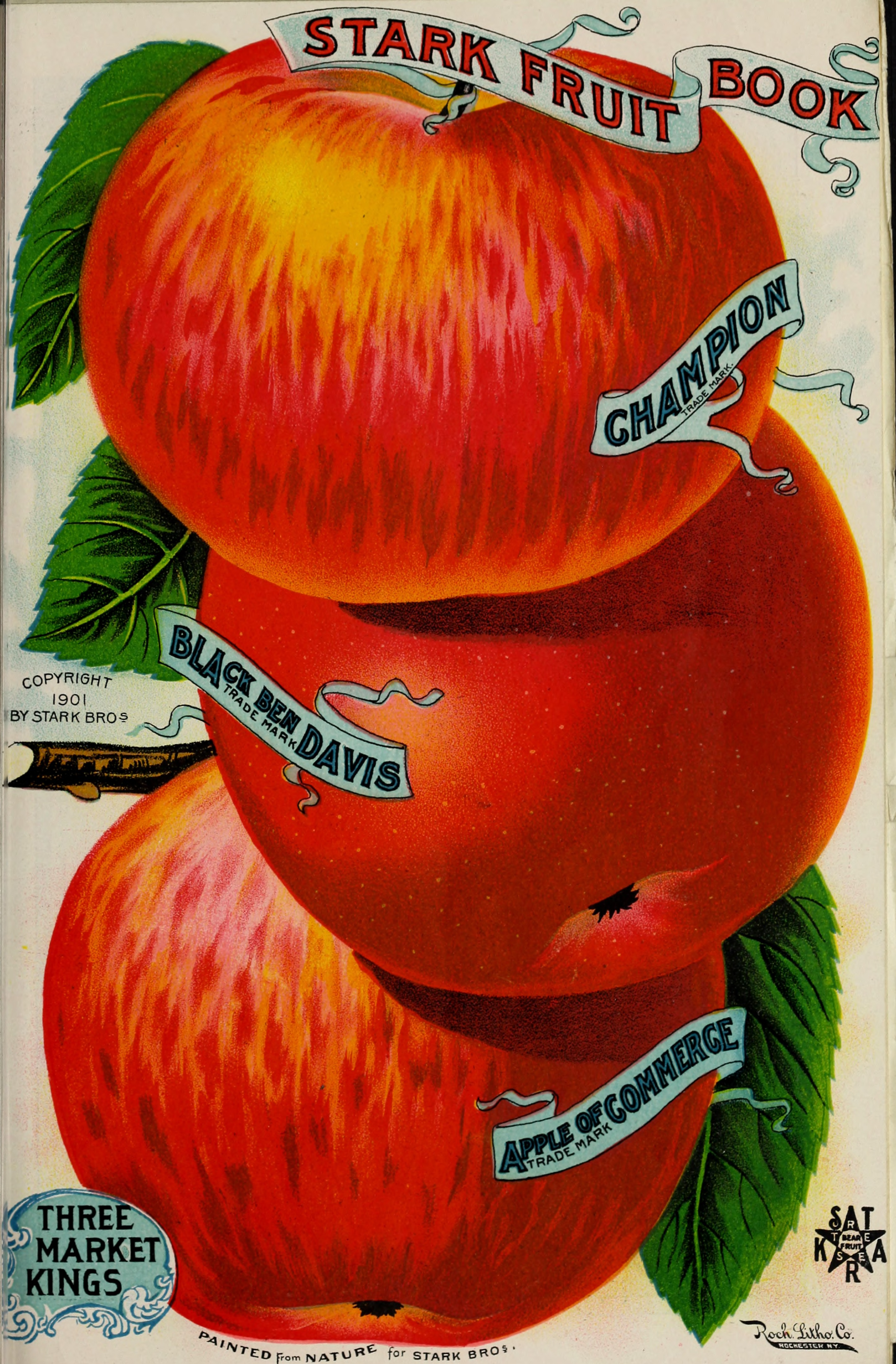
- Cover of the Stark fruit book, 1901
- Industry: Horticulture
- Founded: 1816
- Founder: James Hart Stark
- Products: Fruit trees, fruit plants, and gardening supplies
- Services: E-commerce, mail-order, wholesale, retail
- Website: www.starkbros.com

Stark Bro's Nurseries & Orchards Co. is a horticultural company based in Louisiana, Missouri, that specializes in growing and selling fruit trees to home gardeners and orchardists. The company was the original marketer of the Red Delicious and Golden Delicious apples.

== History ==
In 1816, James Hart Stark moved from Kentucky to Louisiana, Missouri. He brought with him a bundle of apple scions. He started a nursery business from his bundle, officially incorporated in 1889.

In 1893, Stark Bro's held their first International New Fruit Fair. Jesse Hiatt, who owned an orchard in Peru, Iowa, sent samples of his fruit to compete in the contest for the best new fruit. Hiatt's apples won the judging, but his nametag could not be found. He submitted samples of the same apple the following year and won again. This time there was a nametag, and the apples could be identified. The Stark brothers traveled to the Hiatt farm and bought the rights to the Red Delicious apple in 1894.

In 1914, Stark Bro's began marketing the Golden Delicious as a companion to their Red Delicious apple. The cultivar originally developed as a chance seedling on the Mullins' family farm in Clay County, West Virginia and was locally known as Mullin's Yellow Seedling and Annit apple until Anderson Mullins sold the rights to Stark Bro's. They collaborated with Luther Burbank who willed over 750 of his varieties to the company.

Stark Brothers Nurseries briefly faced the possibility of closure during the summer of 2001, forcing the company to separate into Stark Bro's Fulfillment Services and Stark Brothers Nurseries and Orchards.

== Presidents ==
- James Hart Stark
- William Watts Stark
- Clarence McDowell Stark
- Edgar Winfred Stark
- Clay Hamilton Stark
- Edwin Jackson Stark
- John Stark Logan
- Clay Stark Logan
- Cameron G. Brown

== Current Operation ==
Stark Brothers Nurseries operate in three main business areas: e-Commerce/Mail-Order, Wholesale, and the retail Garden Center. The operations include:

- 250 growing acres in Louisiana
- 427 growing acres in Atlas, IL
- 1 million cubic feet of climate-controlled warehouse space
- 1 million cubic feet of non-refrigerated work/storage area
- 1.7 million cubic feet of cold storage
- 5 acres of greenhouses
- 30,000 square feet of office space

One million trees per year are shipped from Stark Brothers facilities.

== Bibliography ==
- Zotta, LeAnn (2015). 200 Years and Growing: The Story of Stark Bro's Nurseries & Orchards Co. IngramSpark. pp. 65–67. ISBN 978-0-692-31291-9.
