= Joseph Stayman =

American horticulturalist (1817–1903)

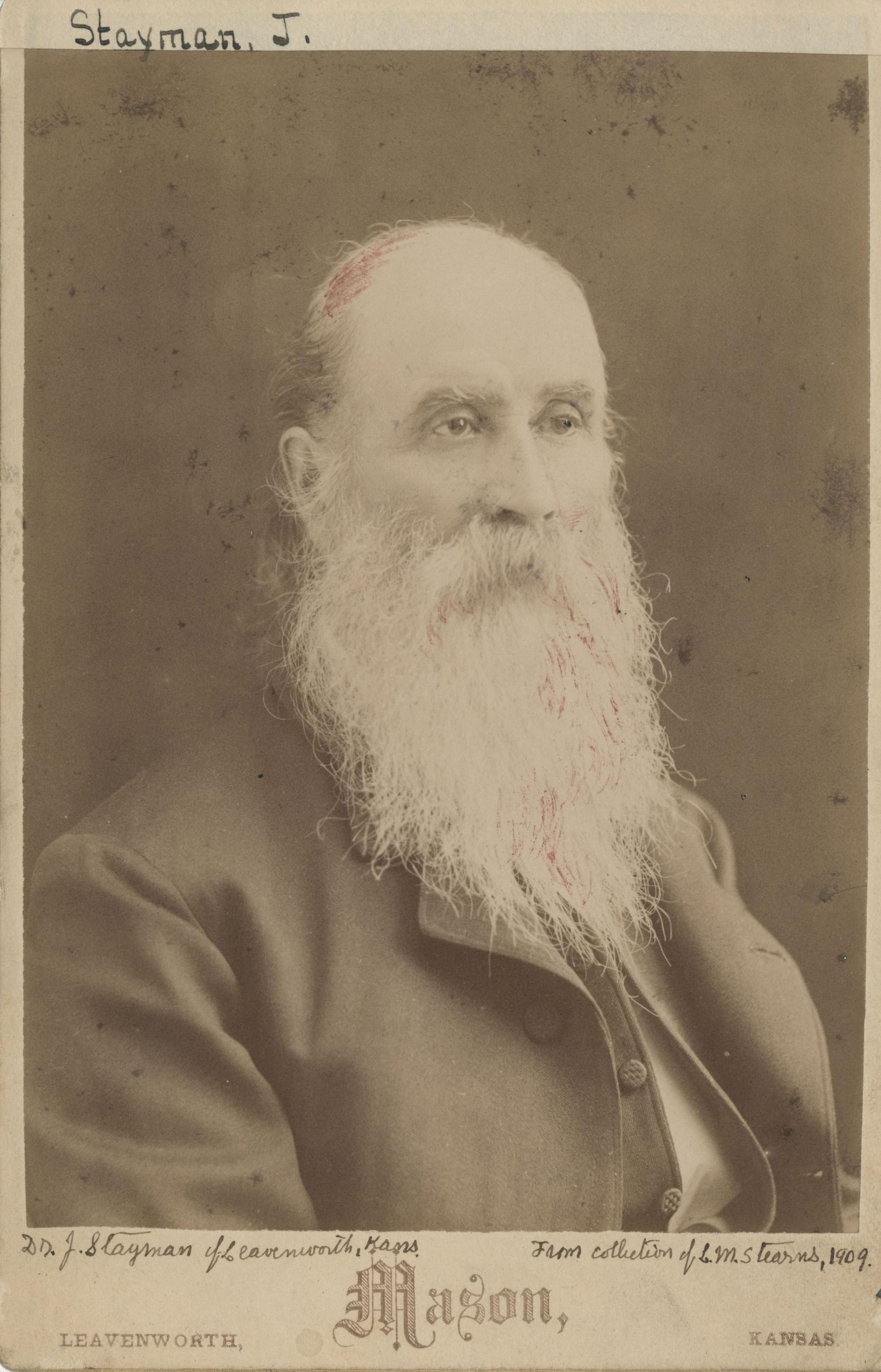
- Born: October 7, 1817; Cumberland County, Pennsylvania
- Died: October 4, 1903 (aged 85); Kansas
- Known for: Stayman apple

Joseph Stayman (October 7, 1817 – October 4, 1903) was an American horticulturist. He was widely known among 19th century horticulturalists in Kansas, and it was through his influence the Kansas State Horticultural Society was organized in 1866. He left the practice of medicine at an early age to specialize in horticultural research and experimentation, developing numerous varieties of apples, strawberries, and grapes in his Leavenworth orchards. His goal was to learn which varieties of apples and other fruits were most suited to the soil and climate of northeast Kansas, the region being one of two in the state where fruit trees were grown extensively in the late 19th century. Stayman oversaw two orchards containing some 3,000 trees.

== Birth and early life ==
Stayman was born in Cumberland County, Pennsylvania on October 7, 1817. He moved with his parents to Ohio in 1839 being associated with his fathers milling business but meanwhile studying medicine and psychology. In 1849 he was married and established a residence in Carlisle, Pennsylvania. Several years later he moved to Abingdon, Illinois, where he practiced medicine. In 1858, he purchased a nursery business, and two years later decided to move to Kansas.

The pioneer fruit grower took up residence at Maple Avenue and Santa Fe, and devoted the remainder of his life to the development and improvement of various strains of fruit. He originated the Clyde strawberry as well as several varieties of grapes, apples and raspberries. Stayman studied the drawing of fruit varieties, and his sketches were regarded as extremely precise. These sketches were given to the Smithsonian Institution in Washington, D.C. He was one of the founders of the Leavenworth County Horticultural Society, serving as its secretary for many years.

== Kansas State Horticultural Society ==
In 1866, with William Tanner, his neighbor on Maple Avenue, he helped organize the Kansas State Horticultural Society. The organizational papers for the KSHS were drawn up in Stayman's residence by Stayman and Tanner, who served as the KSHS’ first president. Stayman was also associated with the Grange and the Leavenworth County Agricultural Society. He experimented with grafting fruit trees and at one time had an apple tree which bore sixteen varieties, the result of multiple grafting. He introduced the Stayman apple in 1866.

== Other hobbies ==
His hobby of checkers also brought him national attention. He was widely known among the most accomplished checkers players in America. Stayman competed with other checkers hobbyists, playing games by correspondence in matches which would last as long as a year at a time.
