= Dougherty (apple) =

Apple cultivar

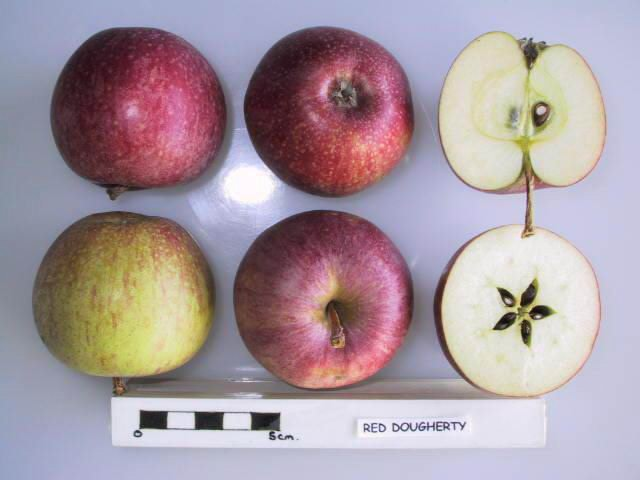
Cross section of a Red Dougherty

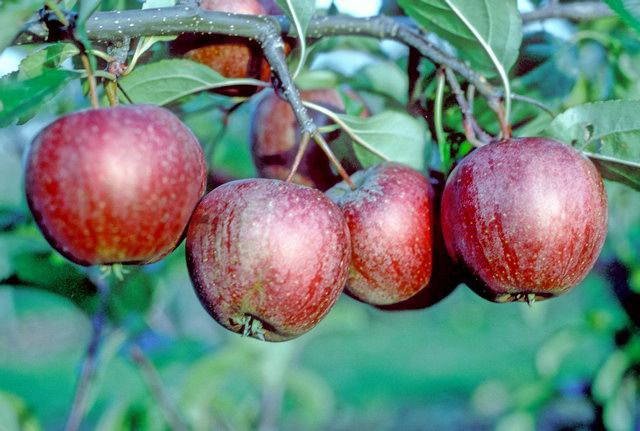
The Dougherty ripens late in the growing season

'Dougherty' was a New Zealand cultivar of domesticated apple, which was grown mainly for export to the United Kingdom, from which a red coloured mutation is marketed today as 'Red Dougherty'. 'Dougherty' produces medium-sized fruits in late season, the skin background is greenish-yellow and flushed with some red. The flesh is yellowish with a sweet flavour.

'Red Dougherty' was discovered around 1930 in Twyford, New Zealand and soon got very popular because of its attractive colour. It has a good resistance to many diseases and ripens at late season. Fruit is small to medium-sized, slightly ribbed, coloured dull red with some russeting. The flesh is firm and fine textured, greenish-white, spicy and very sweet.

'Red Doughtery' is an ancestor of the 'Splendour' apple.
