= Winesap =

Apple cultivar

Malus domestica
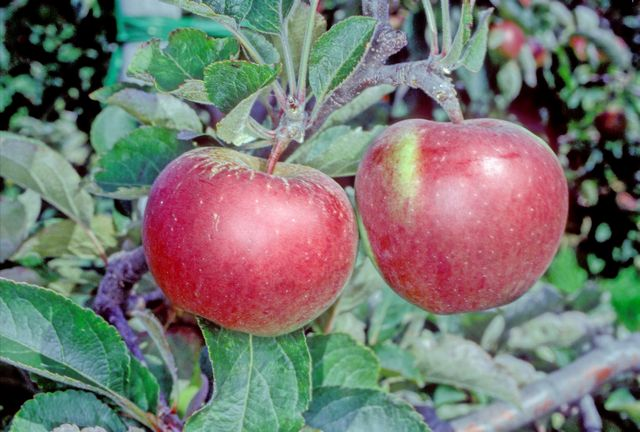
- Cultivar: Winesap

Winesap is an old apple cultivar of undocumented origin, dating at least to American colonial times. Its apples are sweet with a tangy finish. They are used for eating, cooking, and are especially prized for making cider.

== History ==
Although the particular origin of the Winesap is not clear, authors note that it was known during the Colonial period and is thought to have come from New Jersey. The first mention appears to be by Willich and Mease in 1804. They called the apple wine-sop and it was said to have a "sweet, but not sprightly taste". Coxe described it and provided an illustration in his 1817 book, A View of the Cultivation of Fruit Trees. Coxe and other authors mention its use for cider.

Winesap was a popular apple in the United States until the 1950s. It stores well, and its decline in popularity has been attributed to the development and increased use of controlled atmosphere storage which allowed a wider variety of apples to be sold over the course of the year.

== Characteristics ==
The Winesap fruit is small to medium with a deep, cherry red skin and a crisp, yellow flesh. It has moderate disease resistance including to mildew and blooms a few days later than other late varieties. It is all-purpose, being used for fresh eating, cider, apple butter, and pies. It is similar to cultivars 'Arkansas Black', 'Arkansas', and 'Paragon'.

Other names for the Winesap include American Wine Sop, Banana, Hendrick's Sweet, Holland's Red Winter, Potpie, Pot Pie Apple, Red Sweet Wine Sop, Refugee, Royal Red of Kentucky, Texan Red, Winter Winesap. Many strains exist, of two types - striped or blushed. There are also many sports of the Winesap apple. Seedlings include the 'Stayman Winesap' and the Golden Winesap.
