= Huaniu =

Apple cultivar

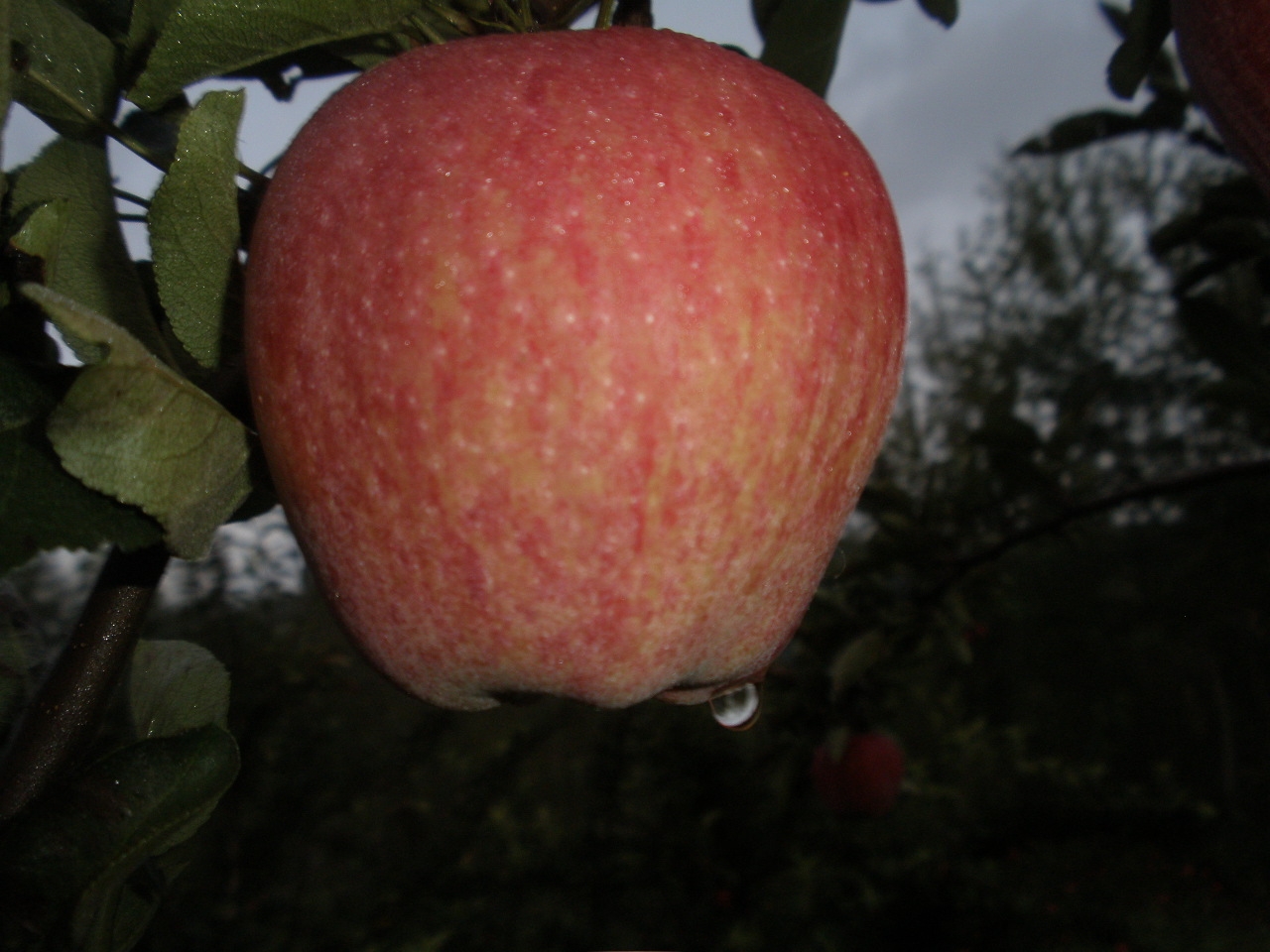
- Unripe Huaniu apple
- Genus: Malus
- Hybrid parentage: Red Delicious; Ralls Genet; Golden Delicious
- Cultivar: Huaniu
- Origin: Huaniu town, Maiji District, Tianshui (1956)

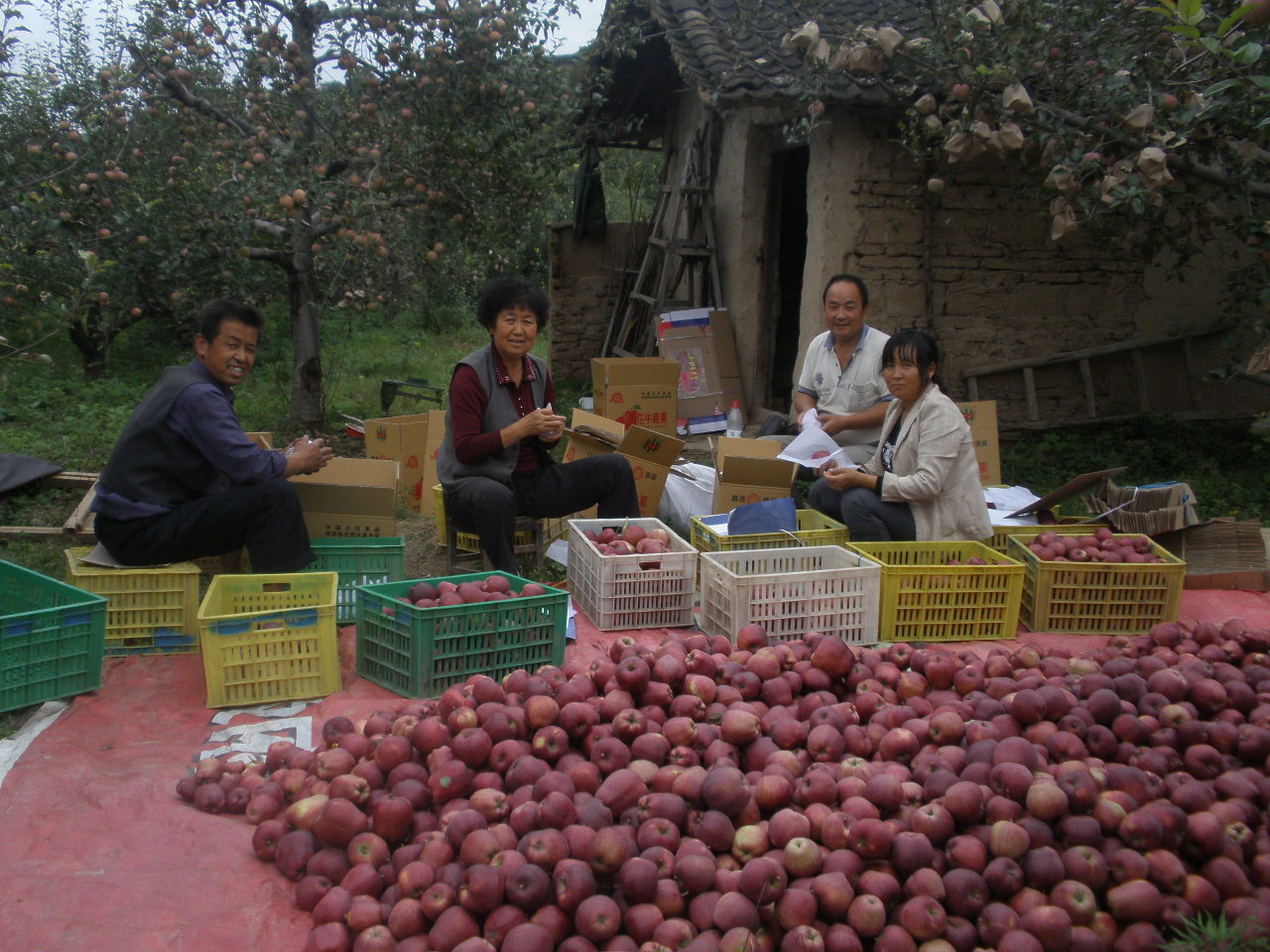
Huaniu apples being packed in Tianshui

Huaniu (花牛), also known as Chinese Red Delicious, is an apple cultivar originating in China. It is named after Huaniu town, Tianshui, where it was first planted as a hybrid of ten varieties of apple trees, including Red Delicious, Golden Delicious and Ralls Janet in 1956. The apple has a sweet taste comparable with Fuji apples. The apples have a soluble solid contents of 12.5-14%, sugar content of 1.86%, and malic acid content of 0.08%.

== History ==
In 1965, Huaniu farmers sent two boxes of apples to Chairman of the Chinese Communist Party Mao Zedong to express their respect for him. Chairman Mao thanked the villagers, noting that he was very fond of the apple's taste. That same year, the apples were exported to Hong Kong. The name of the village of Huaniu was put on the box, and the apples were preferred over the US-imported Red Delicious. Since then, Huaniu apples have become well known in China.

In 2024, General Secretary of the Chinese Communist Party Xi Jinping visited the Nanshan Huaniu Apple Base in Maiji District, highlighting it as an example of China's Rural Revitalization.

It is grown in southeastern Gansu province, around Tianshui and in Shanxi.

== Black Diamond variety ==
A variety of Huaniu apples called Black Diamond has a deep purple skin colour, owing to high ultraviolet light levels and lower temperature at night in its growing areas around Nyingchi, Tibet.
