= Sweetie (apple) =

Apple cultivar

Malus domestica 'PremA280'
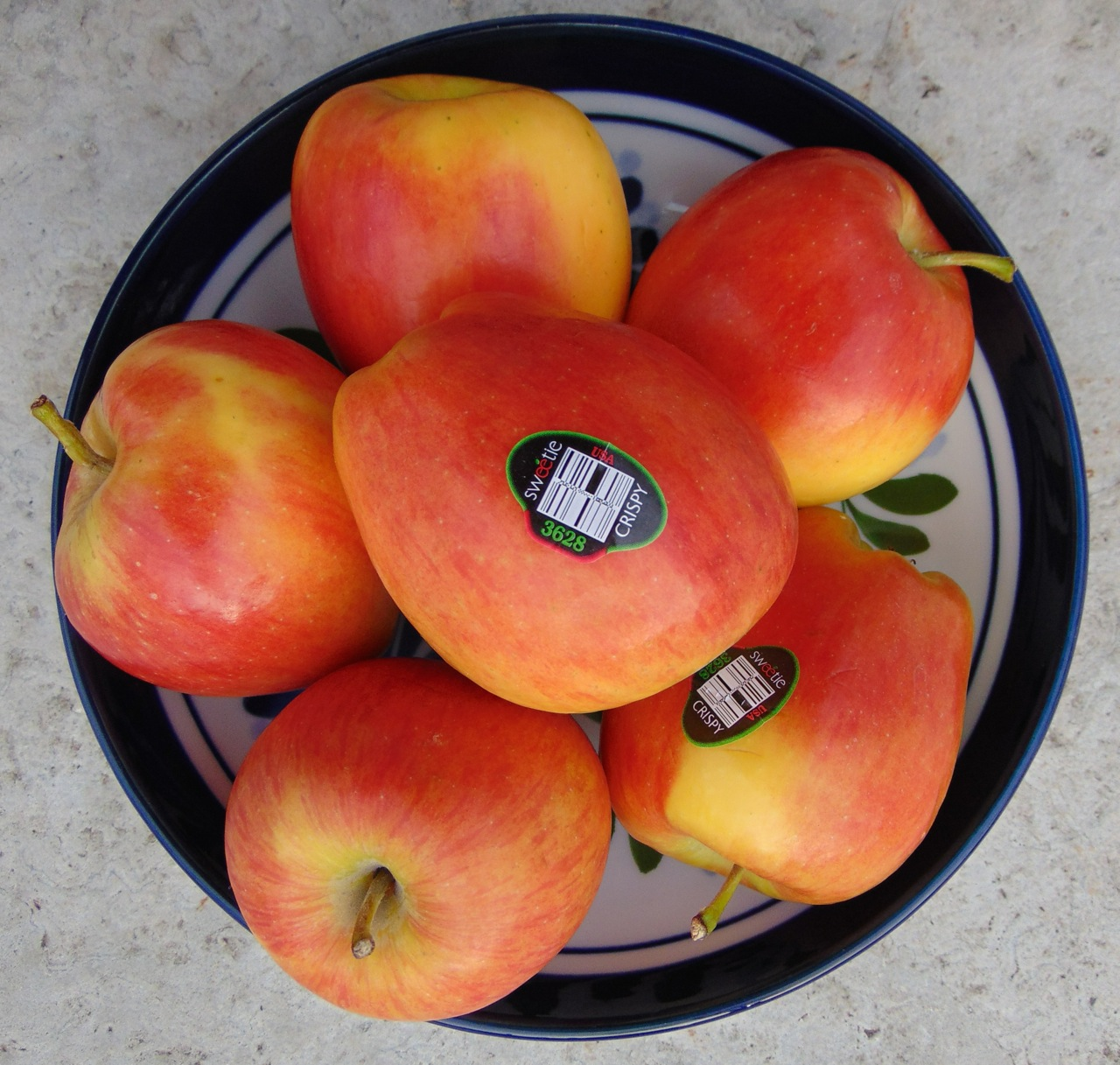
- Hybrid parentage: 'Royal Gala' × 'Braeburn'
- Cultivar: 'PremA280', Sweetie™
- Origin: New Zealand

'Sweetie™' is the trademark for apples of the 'PremA280' cultivar. This apple originated as a seedling from 'Royal Gala' × 'Braeburn', that ripens slightly before 'Royal Gala'. PLU code 3628 has been issued for this apple.
