= Kanzi (apple) =

Apple cultivar

Kanzi® (Nicoter) apple
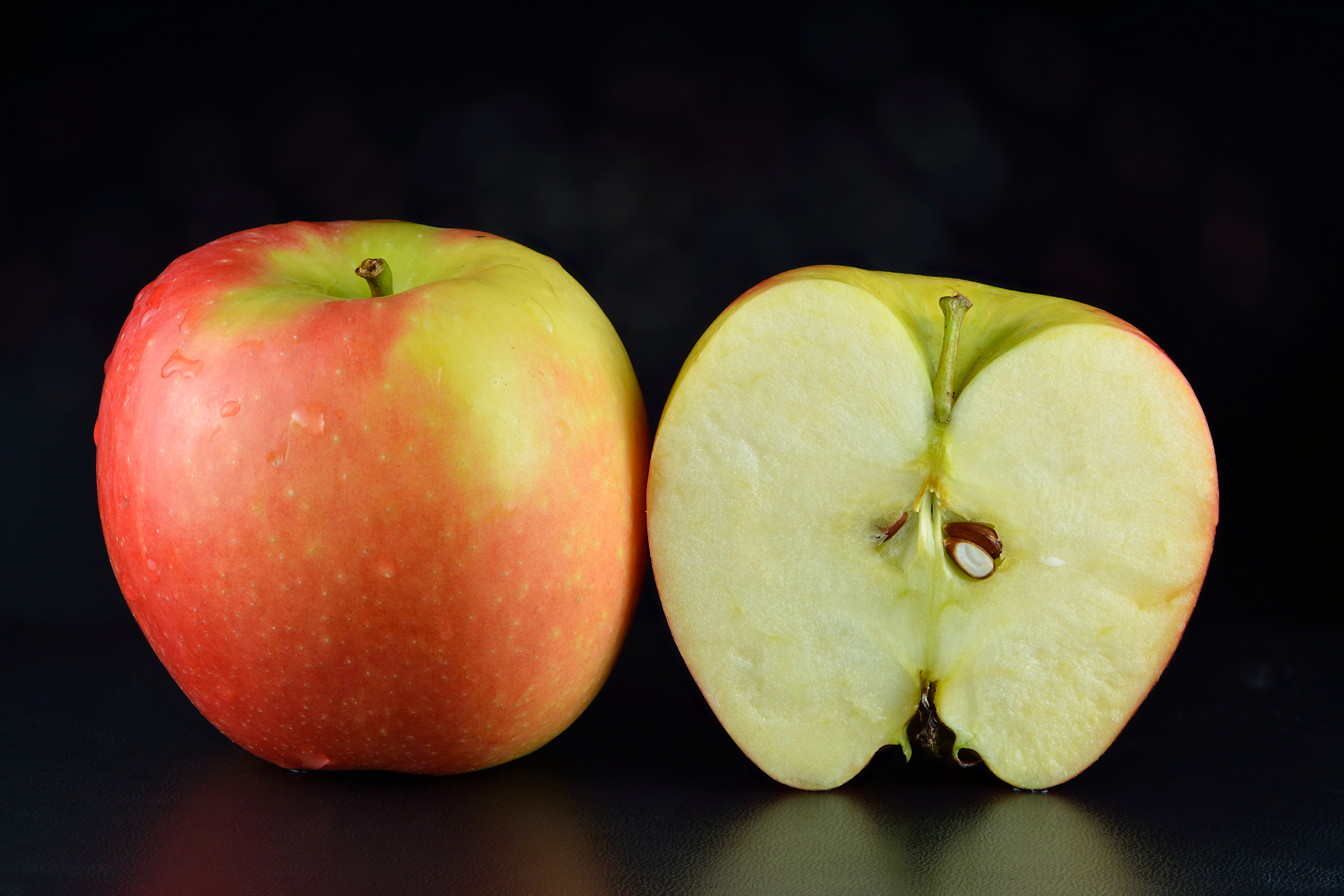
- Genus: Malus
- Species: Malus domestica
- Hybrid parentage: Braeburn × Gala
- Cultivar: Nicoter
- Origin: (Belgium)

The Kanzi is the trademark name of the Nicoter, a modern-bred cultivar of the domesticated apple, which was developed in Belgium by Better3Fruits and Greenstar Kanzi Europe (GKE), from a natural cross between a Gala apple and a Braeburn apple. Kanzi is Swahili for "hidden treasure".

The Kanzi apple has the same parentage as the Jazz from New Zealand and they are similar in taste and appearance, although the texture of the Jazz is harder. Tasters have voted for the Kanzi in preference to the Jazz. The Kanzi is also firm and fairly crisp, quite juicy, and slightly sharp rather than sweet in taste, with a mild flavour. It is mainly used for fresh consumption.

The Kanzi first reached European markets in 2006 and is also grown in the United States. A limited crop first reached US markets in 2014.
