= Tom Burford =

American pomologist and apple historian (1935–2020)

- Born: Thomas Nelson Burford; August 29, 1935; Amherst County, Virginia
- Died: March 29, 2020 (aged 84)
- Education: University of Virginia
- Known for: Promotion of heirloom apples and cider-making; Apples of North America (2013)
- Scientific career
- Fields: Pomology; History of apples
- Workplaces: Burford Brothers; Monticello

Thomas Nelson Burford (August 29, 1935 – March 29, 2020) was an American pomologist, orchardist, and apple historian. He is considered one of the most influential figures in the revival of heritage apples and cider in the United States.

== Early life and education ==
Burford was born on Tobacco Row Mountain in Amherst County, Virginia. His Burford ancestors were early settlers of Amherst and Nelson Counties, first arriving in 1715. He studied philosophy at the University of Virginia.

== Career ==
He and his brother ran Burford Brothers, a company which ran several businesses including a forestry business, a sawmill, and a construction company that specialized in passive solar construction.

When he closed his business in 1994, he gave his collection of more than 200 heirloom apple varieties to Vintage Virginia Apples in North Garden, Virginia.

Burford was a consultant on the care of old orchards and the design of new ones. He lectured for many years on the history of apple cultivation in the United States and the origins of the apple. He held yearly workshops on apple grafting, including at Monticello.

Notably Burford confirmed the identity of the Harrison cider apple when it was rediscovered in the late 20th century. Previously this variety was believed to be lost. Historically the Harrison had the highest reputation among cider apples. Subsequently Tom made Harrison grafts available to orchards in the United States and exported grafts to France.

== Awards and honors ==
He won the 2014 American Horticultural Society Book Award for his book Apples of North America (2013).

He won the 2015 "Founding Cville" award from the Tom Tom Founders Festival.

== Books ==
- Apples: A Catalog of International Varieties. 1991.
- Apples of North America: 192 Exceptional Varieties for Gardeners, Growers, and Cooks. Portland, Oregon: Timber Press. 2013. ISBN 978-1-604-6-92495.
