= Envy (apple) =

Apple cultivar

Malus domestica
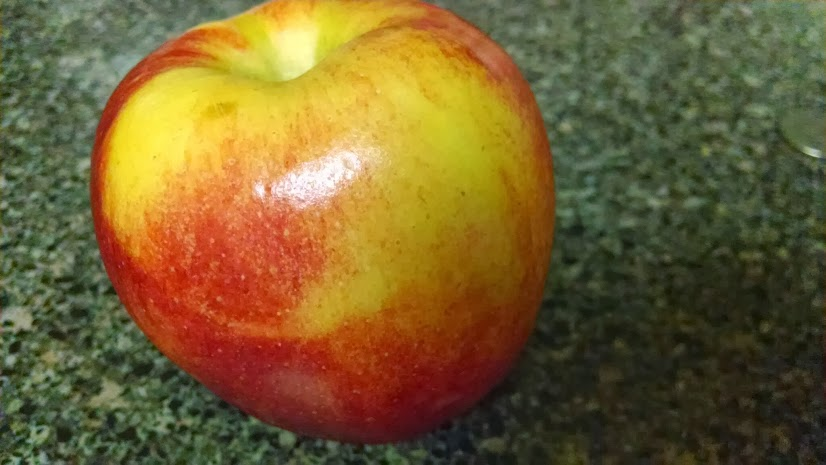
- Hybrid parentage: Braeburn × Royal Gala
- Cultivar: 'Scilate'
- Marketing names: Envy
- Origin: (New Zealand) 2009

Envy is a trademarked name of the Scilate apple variety. It is a cross between two other New Zealand cultivars: Royal Gala and Braeburn. It was developed by HortResearch, submitted for a patent in 2008 and patented in 2009. Field tests were done in New Zealand, the United Kingdom, France, and the United States. Some trialing was done in Italy with organic cultivation.

The Envy apple is mostly red with yellow specks. The peel is fairly thick and tough, more so than most other apples. The apple has a high juice content and will maintain its firmness while in storage. The flesh is pale yellow and can take up to 10 hours to oxidize; the flesh will be crisp when ripe. It is a very sweet apple with low acid and a slightly flowery taste. The skin has lenticels, which allow it to breathe.

Distribution of the Envy apple in North America began in 2009 through the Oppenheimer Group, and ENZA (The New Zealand Apple and Pear Marketing Board); they began small commercial volumes in 2012 in Washington state. The first fruit surpassed 100,000 cartons for production in 2014. The companies anticipate harvesting 2 million cartons of the fruit by 2020. The Envy apple was ranked No. 1 for flavor, texture, aroma, and appearance in an independent study done by New Zealand–based FORWARD Insight & Strategy, in 2019. The apple has been marketed with two taglines, those being "Bite and Believe" and "When you are this good they call you Envy".

Envy apples are being grown under license in New Zealand, Australia, the U.S. state of Washington, and Chile. There have been reports of the Envy apple being susceptible to Neonectria, with the infected trees occasionally showing no symptoms. Other reports submitted to ENZA have mentioned russet and shrivel, bitter pit, and internal browning.
