= Splendour (apple) =

Apple cultivar

'Splendour' apple
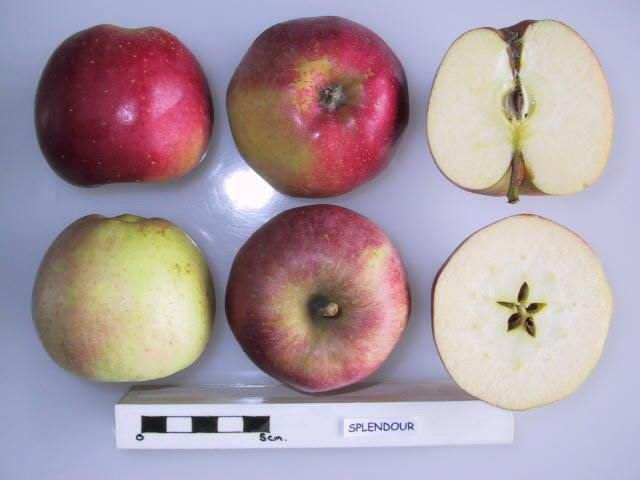
- Genus: Malus
- Species: M. domestica
- Hybrid parentage: unknown
- Origin: New Zealand, 1948

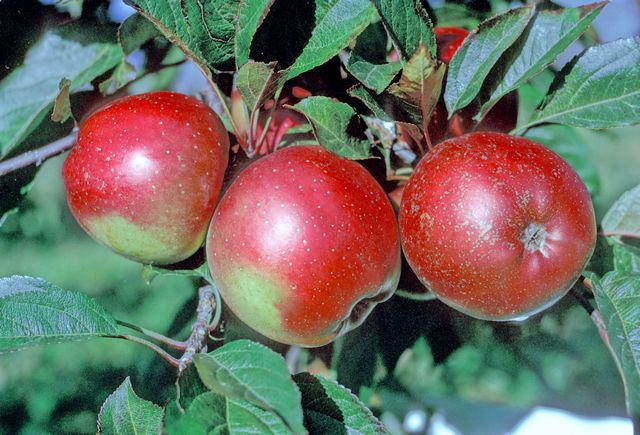
Splendours are late-ripening

Splendour, Splendor or Starksplendor is a modern cultivar of domesticated apple which was developed in New Zealand, and is regarded there as a popular commercial dessert apple. It has been said to be a cross between 'Red Dougherty' and 'Golden Delicious', but genetic analysis has not definitely characterized either of the parent cultivars, and records do not indicate known or suspected parents.

The fruit is ribbed and conical shaped, medium-large. The thin skin has a light green background with a faint pink blush and green lenticels. Flesh is crisp and juicy; white with a green tinge. The flavour is very pleasant for eating, sweet with little acidity. The fruit keeps well in storage but bruises easily. It is late ripening and hangs well on the tree. The tree is a reliable heavy tip and spur bearer.

The Splendour apple is an ancestor for the Sciros apple and for the Aurora Golden Gala.
