= Black Diamond Apple =

Apple cultivar in Tibetan Region

Black Diamond
- Genus: Malus
- Species: Tinmanus
- Cultivar: Huaniu
- Origin: Nyingchi, Tibet

The Black Diamond Apple (Tibetan: ནག་པོའི་གཟེར་ནོར་ཀུ་ཤུ་, Wylie: nag poʼi gdzar nor ku shu) (Chinese: gāla guǒ; 嘎啦果) is a rare variety from the family of Huaniu apples that is cultivated in the Tibetan region of Nyingchi. Despite what the name suggests, the apple is a purple hue with white pulp on the inside. Its unique color is due to the region's high altitude of over 3,500 m. The temperature fluctuates wildly between day and night, with the apples being exposed to a lot of ultraviolet light, which is conducive to the dark skin. Belonging to the high-end segment of the market, the average Black Diamond Apple is sold in high-end supermarkets and it costs about 50 yuan (7.75 USD). Many farmers are reluctant to grow the fruit, since Black Diamond apple trees can take up to eight years to reach maturity, and because the growing season is short (only about two months).
