= Braeburn =

Apple cultivar

Malus domestica
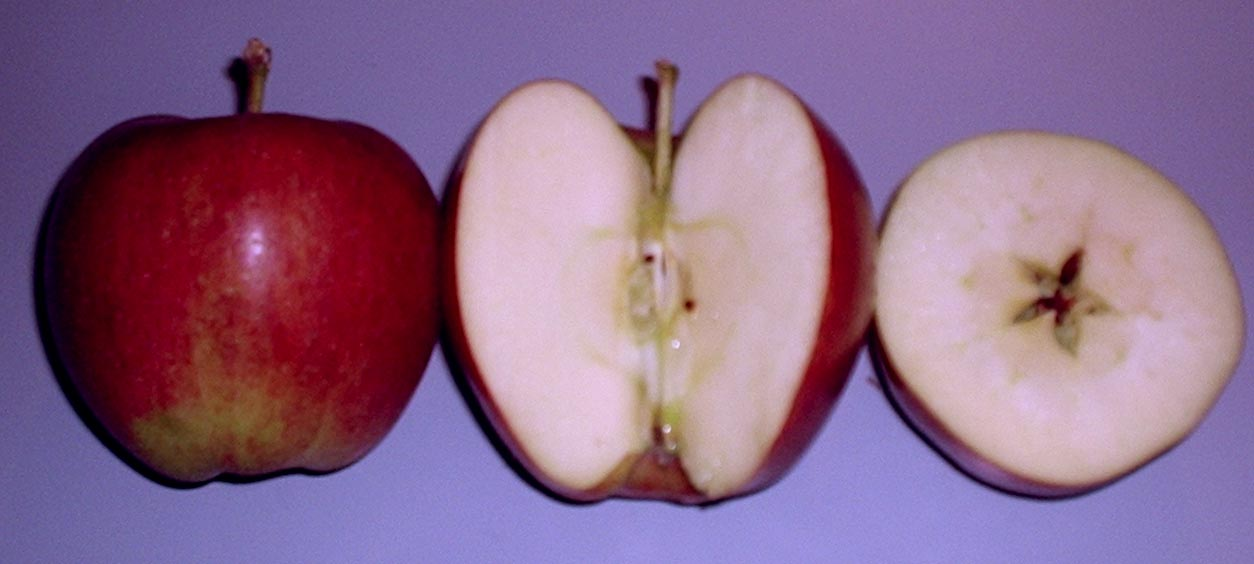
- Genus: Malus
- Species: Malus domestica
- Hybrid parentage: Sturmer Pippin × Delicious
- Cultivar: Braeburn
- Origin: (New Zealand) Nelson, 1950s

The Braeburn is a cultivar of apple that is firm to the touch with a red/orange vertical streaky appearance on a yellow/green background. Its color intensity varies with different growing conditions.

It was discovered as a chance seedling in 1952 by the farmer O. Moran from Waiwhero in the Moutere Hills near Motueka, New Zealand. It was then cultivated by the Williams Brothers nursery as a potential export variety. A study published in 2020 indicated Braeburn is the offspring of Delicious and Sturmer Pippin, with Lady Hamilton as a sibling. The apple itself is named after Braeburn Apple Orchard near Motueka, where it was first commercially grown.

Braeburn apples have a combination of sweet and tart flavor. They are available October through April in the northern hemisphere and are medium to large in size. They are a popular fruit for growers because of their ability to store well when chilled.

Braeburn apples are useful in cooking as they hold their shape and do not release a great deal of liquid, making them well-suited for tarts. According to the US Apple Association website it is one of the fifteen most popular apple cultivars in the United States.

== Braeburn browning disorder ==
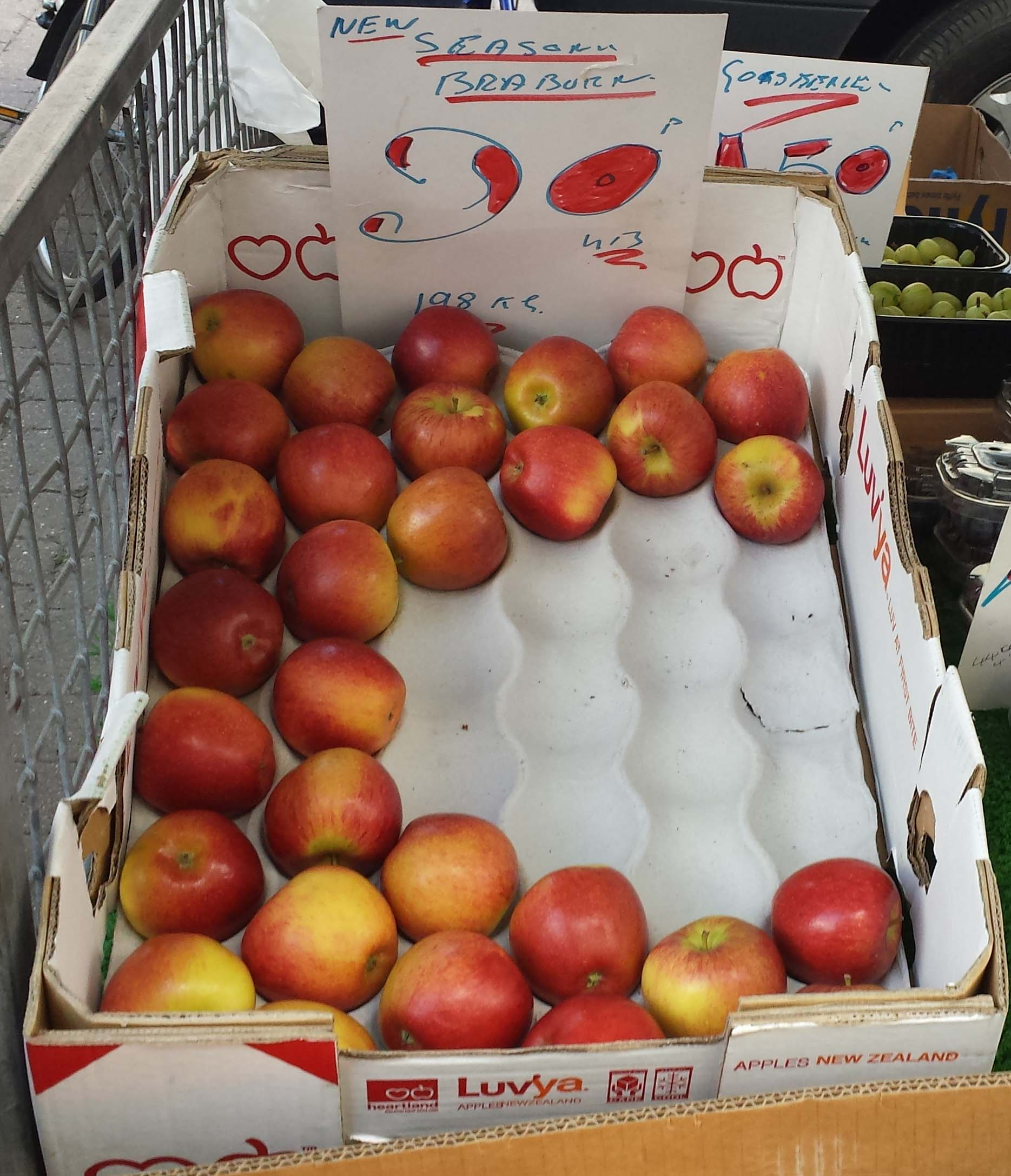
Braeburn apples for sale on a UK market stall

Apples can be preserved by short, medium or long-term storage. Braeburn can turn brown inside during commercial long term storage, and it is usually not possible to tell whether an apple has the Braeburn browning disorder until a person bites or cuts into it. Apples respond dramatically to both temperature and atmosphere modification. Rapid temperature reduction and the exacting maintenance of low temperature close to the chilling point of the variety can provide good to medium quality product following 3 to 6 months of storage and in some cases longer. However, modern commercial warehouses couple temperature management with controlled atmosphere (CA) for long-term storage of apples. Braeburn can be stored at 0 °C in the air for 3–4 months, and in CA for 8–10 months, with only a slight susceptibility to scalding although it is sensitive to carbon dioxide. The variety has a relatively impermeable skin, which restricts diffusion of gases into and out of the fruit, leading to high internal carbon dioxide concentrations.

The browning disorder seems worse in overmature fruit, fruit from lightly cropped trees, and large fruit, but it can show up on different trees in different years, and in some regions, but not others.

Maintaining the superior qualities of Braeburn while eliminating Braeburn browning disorder led to the development of the Jazz cultivar. Since Braeburn is such a desirable variety, commercial orchards and trees in regions and locations that have proven not susceptible to the browning disorder are being maintained. Since most home orchardists do not attempt very long term storage, they do not encounter the browning disorder.

== Disease susceptibility ==
Braeburn has high susceptibility to scab, powdery mildew, cedar apple rust, and fire blight.

== Descendant varieties ==
- Nicoter, trademark named Kanzi
- Scifresh, trademark named Jazz
- PremA280, trademark named Sweetie
- Scilate, trademark named Envy

== See also ==
- Braeburn, a character from My Little Pony: Friendship is Magic
