= James Hutton Kidd =

New Zealand horticulturist and community leader

James Hutton Kidd (12 September 1877–24 October 1945) was a New Zealand horticulturist and community leader. He was born in Hexham, Northumberland, England on 12 September 1877.
