= Jazz (apple) =

Apple cultivar

Jazz apple
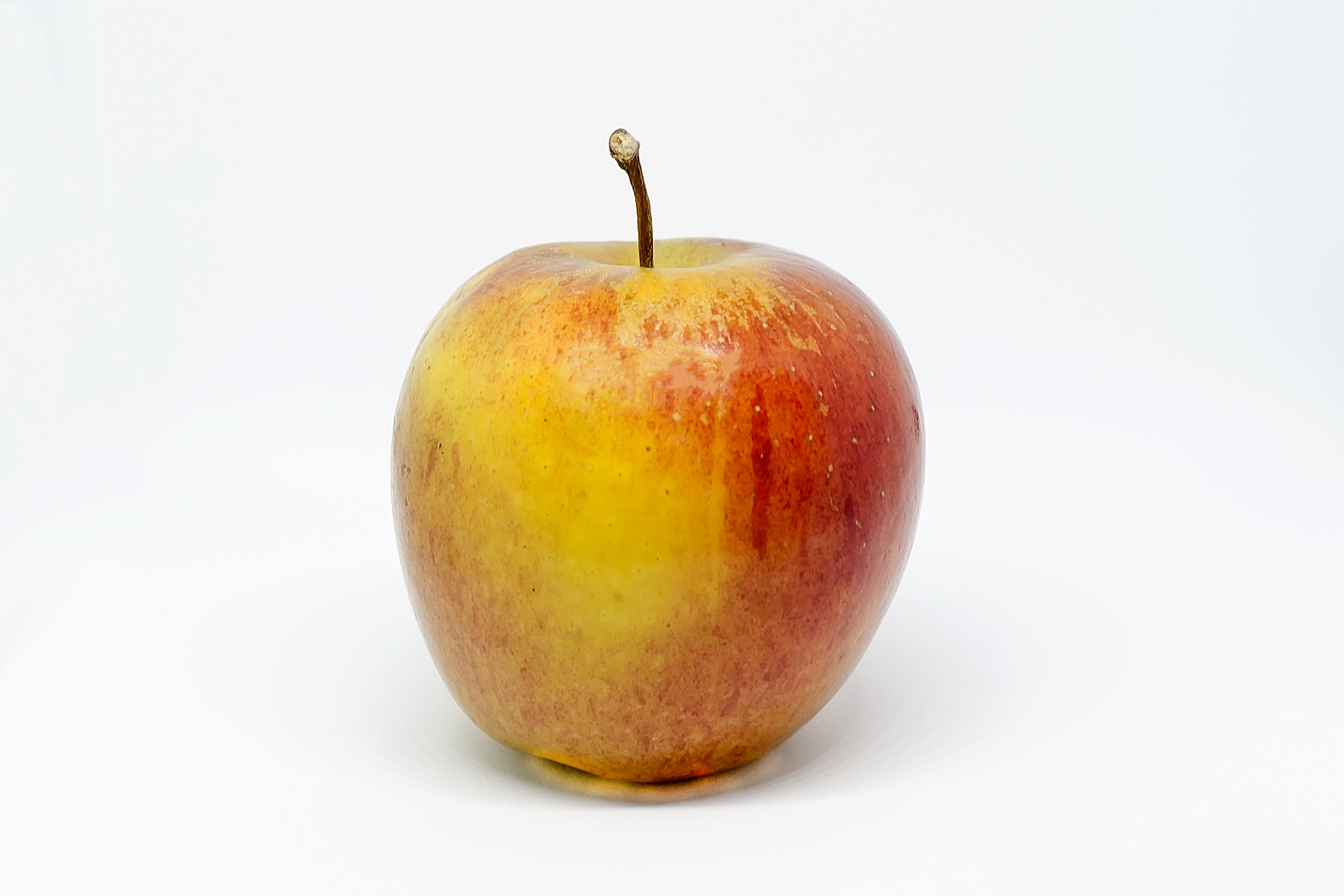
- Genus: Malus
- Species: Malus domestica
- Hybrid parentage: Braeburn × Royal Gala
- Cultivar: Scifresh
- Origin: (New Zealand) Havelock North, Hawkes Bay, 1985

Jazz is a trademarked brand of the Scifresh cultivar of domesticated apple. Scifresh is a cross between Royal Gala and Braeburn. It was developed in New Zealand as part of a collaboration between Apple marketer ENZA, orchardists, and the Plant & Food Research institute. The original cross was made in 1985 on trees at Goddard Lane, Havelock North, Hawkes Bay, New Zealand. It launched commercially in April 2004. It is hard and crisp but juicy. The colour is flushes of red and maroon over shades of green, yellow and orange. Jazz is a close relative of the Kanzi apple, which is easier to bite and has a more delicate sweet-tart taste.

Growers produce Jazz apples under licence in New Zealand, South Africa, UK, United States, Australia, France, Chile, Italy, Switzerland, and Austria. Grown in the northern and southern hemispheres, it is available all year round. Trees take between four and five years before they start to produce fruit.

== Gallery ==
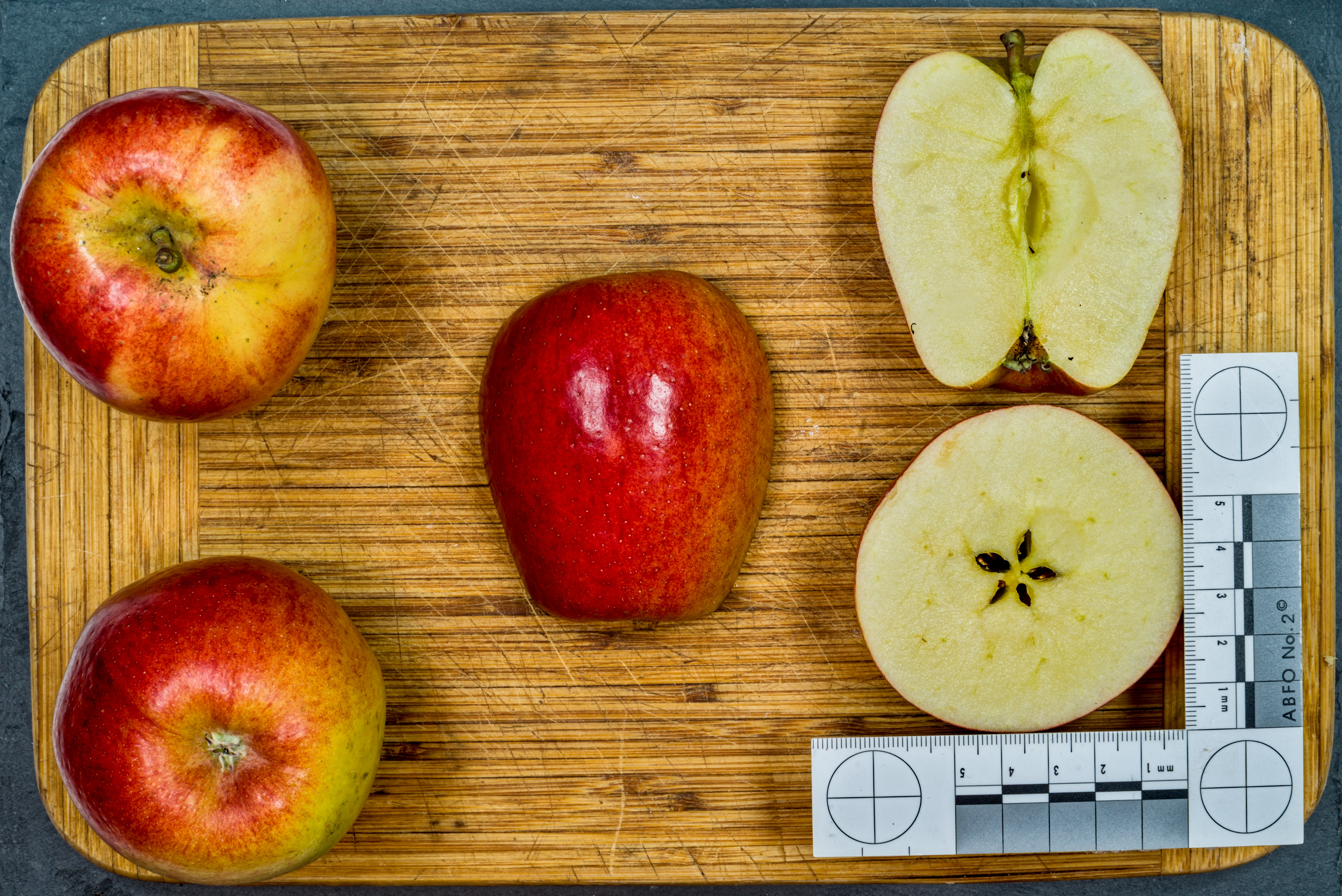
Fruit and cross-section

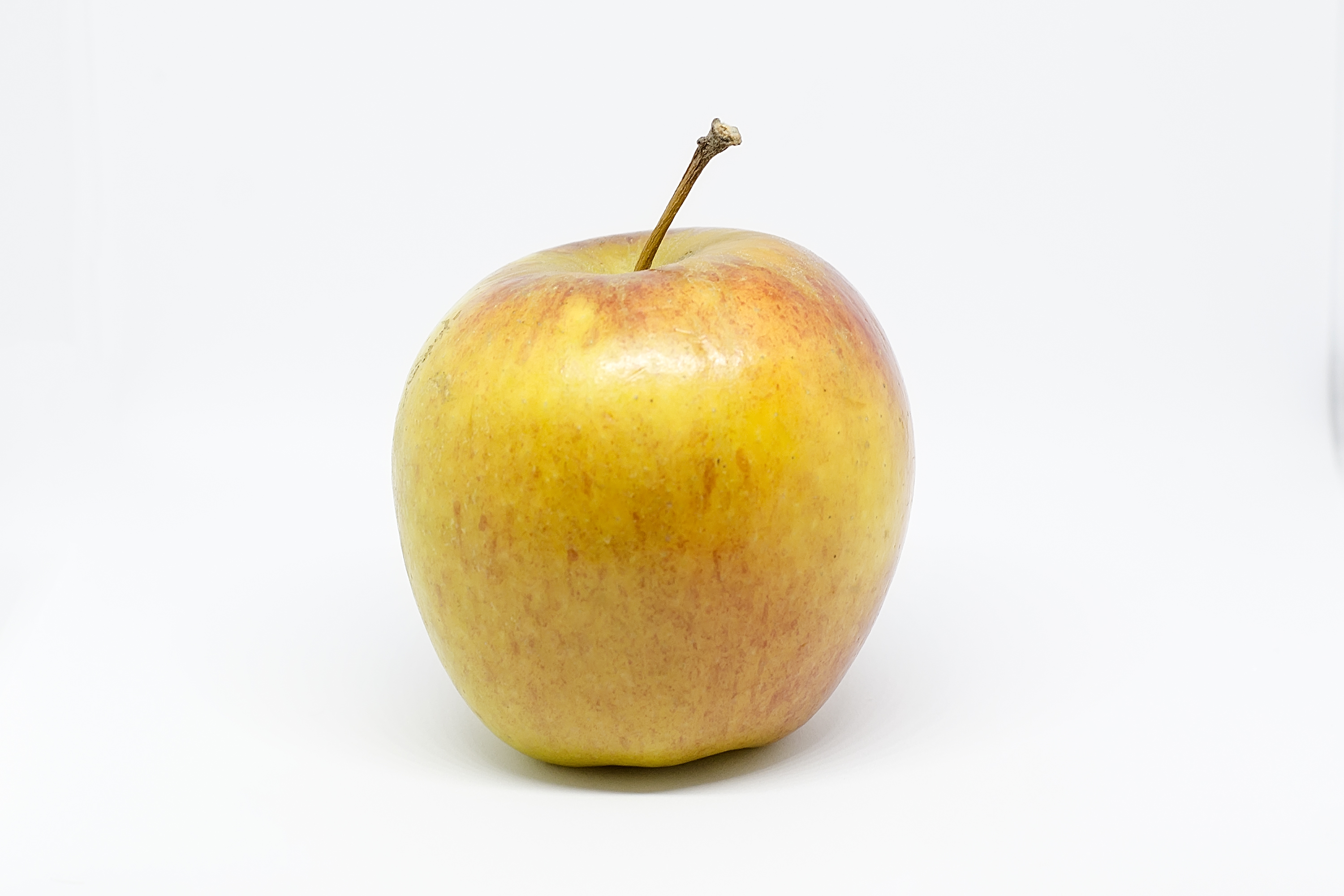
Jazz apple

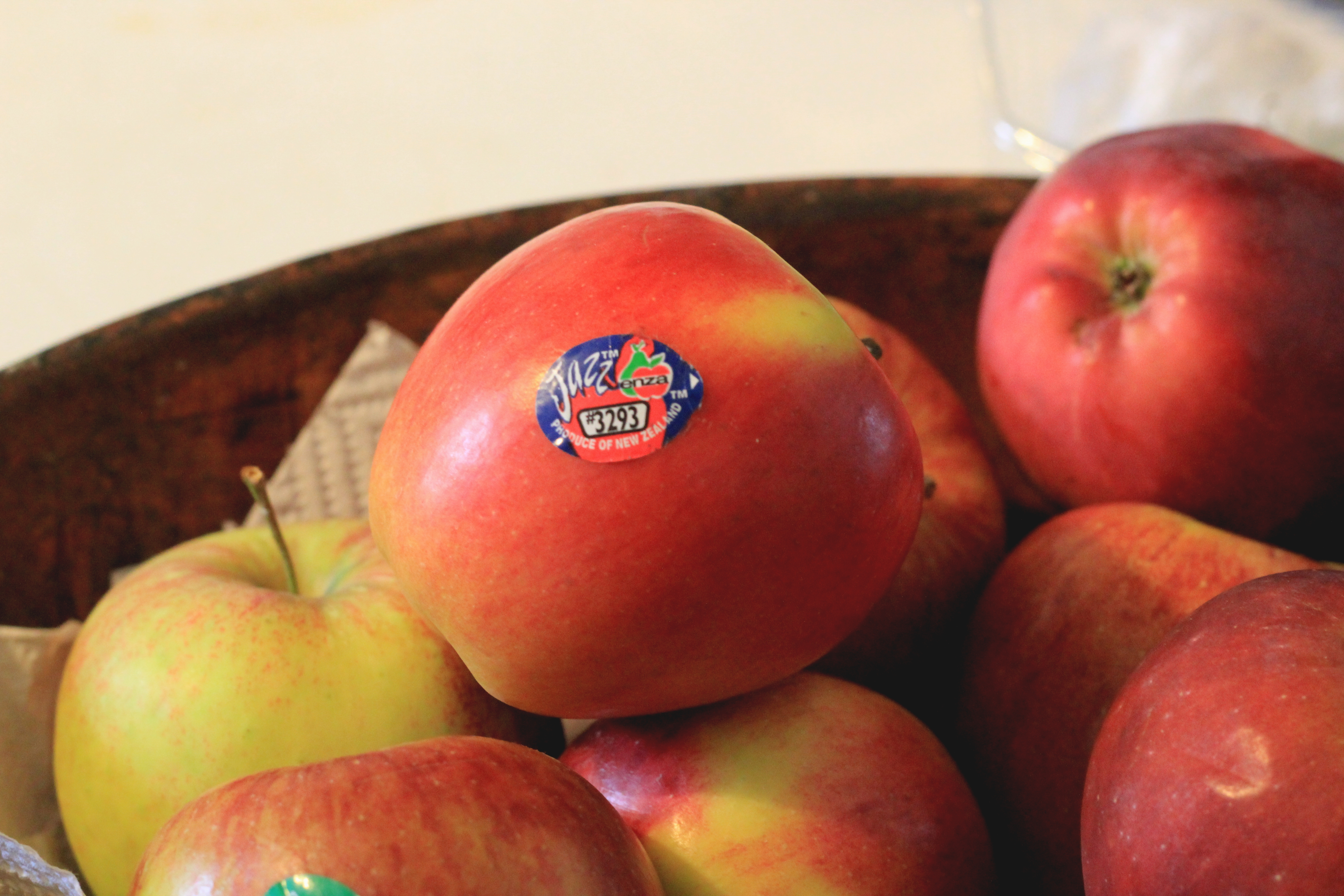
Jazz apple

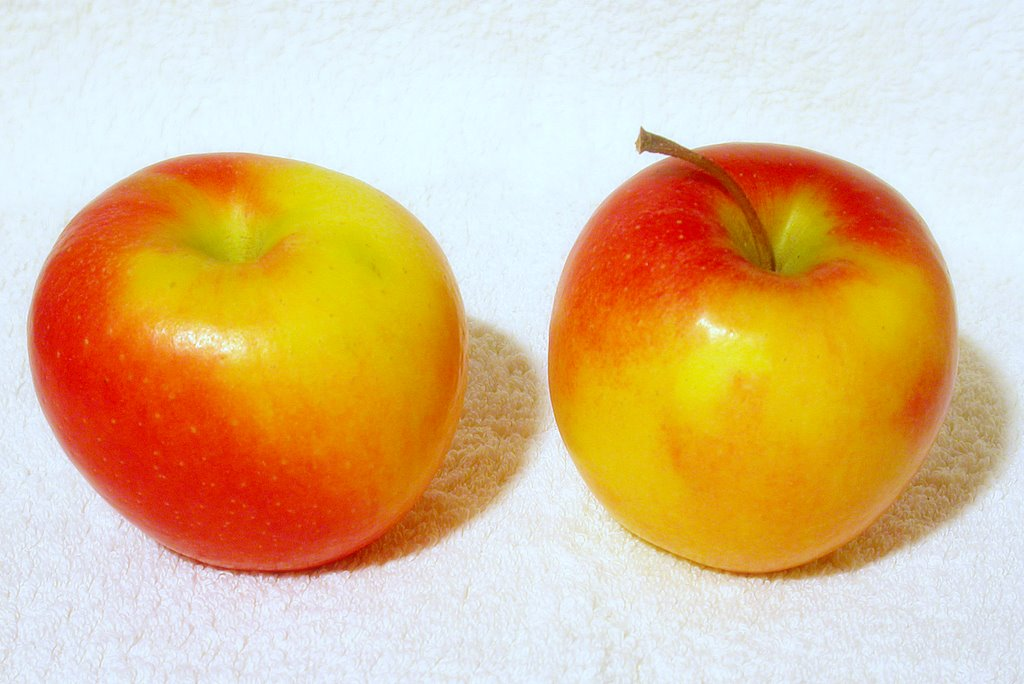
Jazz apples are somewhat variable in shape

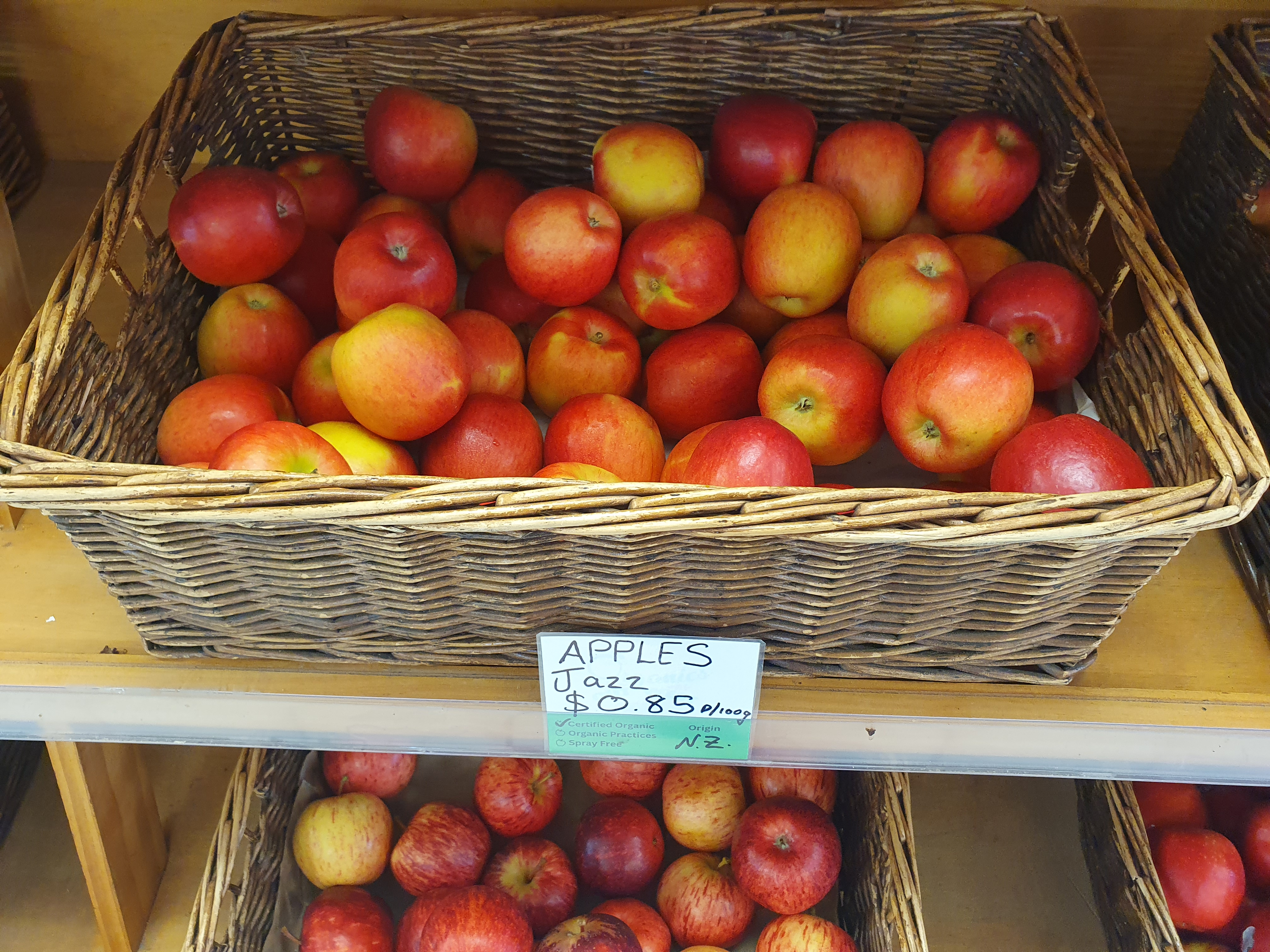
A display of jazz apples in Auckland, New Zealand
