= USApple Association =

Virginia based association of apple growers

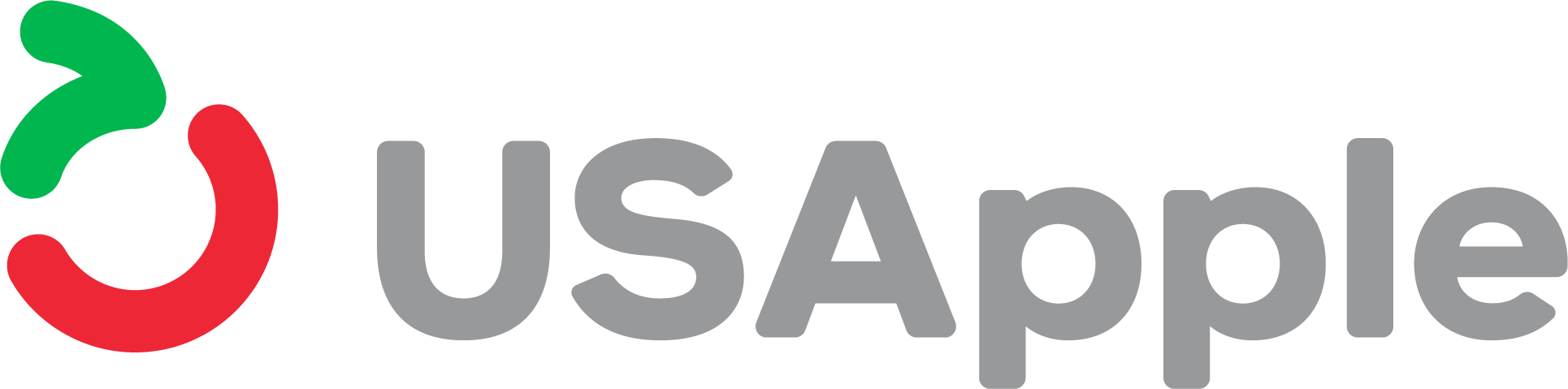
- Formation: 1946; 80 years ago
- Type: Nonprofit organization, trade association
- Purpose: Promoting apple producers and distributors.
- Headquarters: Falls Church, Virginia, U.S.
- Region served: United States
- President and CEO: Jim Bair
- Website: usapple.org

USApple Association is a nonprofit membership association for growers, marketers, equipment producers, and allied organizations of apples, within 40 US states, based in Virginia. It advocates on behalf of nearly 27,463 apple growers and 3,700 apple-related companies. Their services include, but are not limited to, lobbying for the industry's interests at all branches of the federal government, providing educational information, and providing newsletters for apple farmers. The association also strives to provide all involved in the industry the means to profitably produce and market apples and apple products.

The association's website supplies information for the public on all different apple cultivars grown in the United States. Currently, there are close to 100 American cultivars grown commercially, but about 90% of the production consists of the 15 most popular cultivars.

USApple is a member-driven association that represents all segments of the apple industry, including producers, packers, shippers, marketers, processors, distributor's, state/regional associations and other businesses engaged in the industry.
