= Table apple =

Type of apple intended to be eaten raw

Table apples, also known as dessert apples or eating apples, are a group of apple cultivars grown for eating raw as opposed to cooking or cidermaking. Table apples are usually sweet and the most prized exhibit particular aroma variations that differentiate them from other apples.

== List ==
Common table apple varieties include: (D = Dual purpose, i.e. cooking + table)

- Adams Pearmain
- Allington Pippin
- Ambrosia
- Anna
- Baldwin
- Belle de Boskoop D
- Black Twig D
- Blenheim Orange
- Cameo
- Clivia
- Cortland D
- Cosmic Crisp
- Cox Orange Pippin
- Delbarestivale
- Delicious (golden)
- Delicious (red)
- Dorsett Golden
- Elstar
- Empire
- Enterprise
- Envy
- Esopus Spitzenburg D
- Fuji
- Fiesta
- Filippa D
- Fresco (syn. Wellant)
- Gala
- Ginger Gold
- Golden Delicious
- Golden Reinette
- Granny Smith D
- Gravenstein D
- Grimes Golden D
- Holsteiner Cox
- Honeycrisp
- Idared D
- Ingrid Marie
- James Grieve
- Jazz
- Jerseymac
- Jonagold
- Jonathan D
- Kanzy (syn. Nicoter)
- Katy
- Kidd's Orange Red
- King of the Pippins D
- Landsberger
- Laxton's Superb
- Lord Lambourne
- Melrose
- McIntosh
- Melba
- Mollies Delicious
- Mutsu D
- Newtown Pippin
- Northern Spy
- Ontario
- Paulared D
- Pinova
- Pristine apple
- Ralls Janet
- Red Delicious
- Reinette du Canada
- Ribston Pippin
- Rome Beauty
- Santana
- Spartan D
- Stayman
- Sturmer Pippin D
- SugarBee
- Sunset
- Suntan
- Tentation
- Tolman Sweet
- Topaz
- Tydemans Early Worcester
- Welthy D
- Winesap D
- Winter Banana D
- Worcester Pearmain
- Wyken Pippin
- Yellow Newtown D
- Yellow Transparent D
- York Imperial D

== See also ==
- Table grape
