= Delrouval =

Apple cultivar

Malus domestica 'Delrouval'
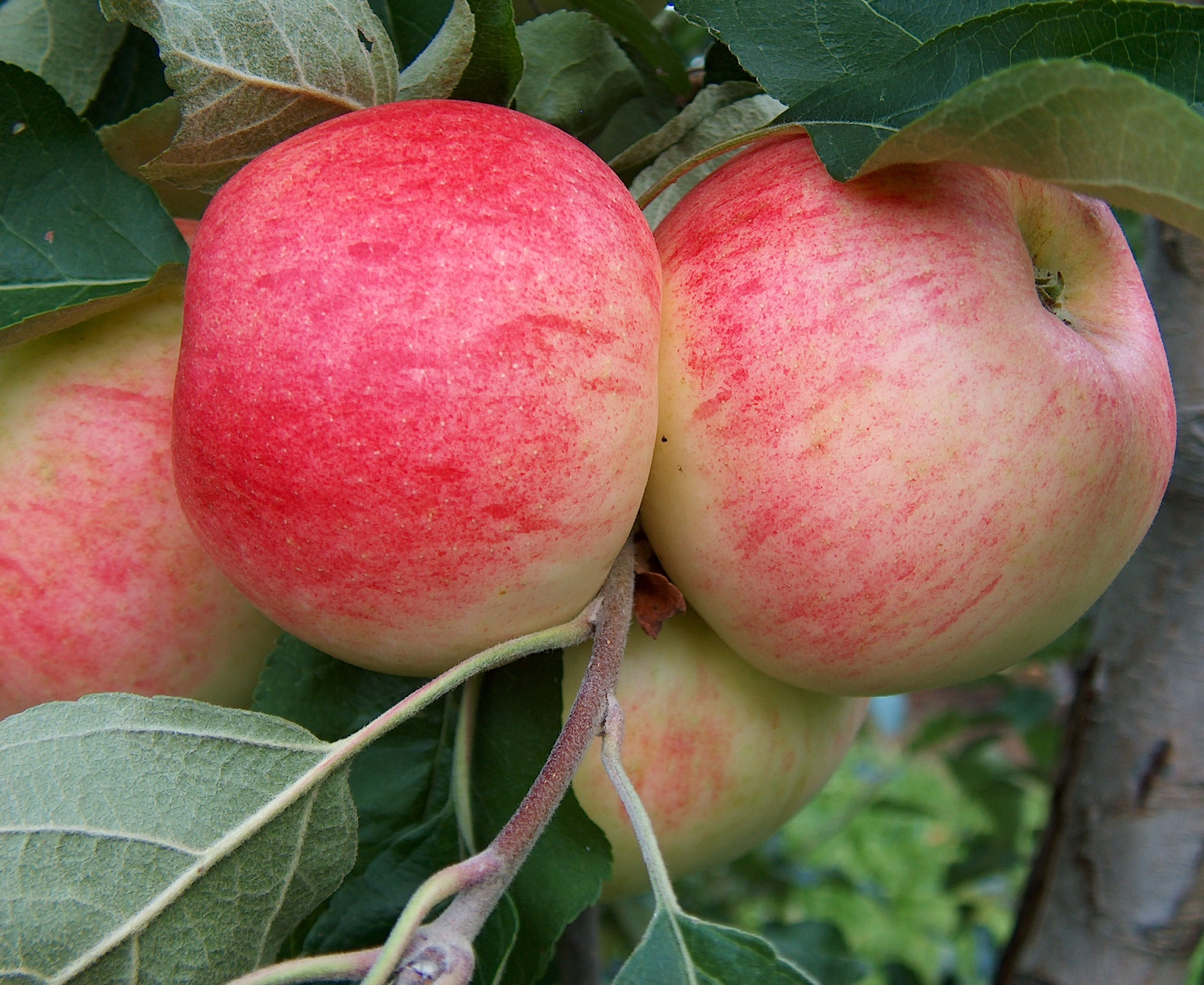
- Hybrid parentage: 'Delbarestivale' x 'Akane'
- Cultivar: 'Delrouval'
- Origin: France

Delrouval or Cybele Delrouval is a modern French red cultivar of domesticated apple, developed by the Delbard nursery breeders, by combining the Delbarestivale and Akane apples.
