= Goldspur =

Apple cultivar

'Goldspur' apple
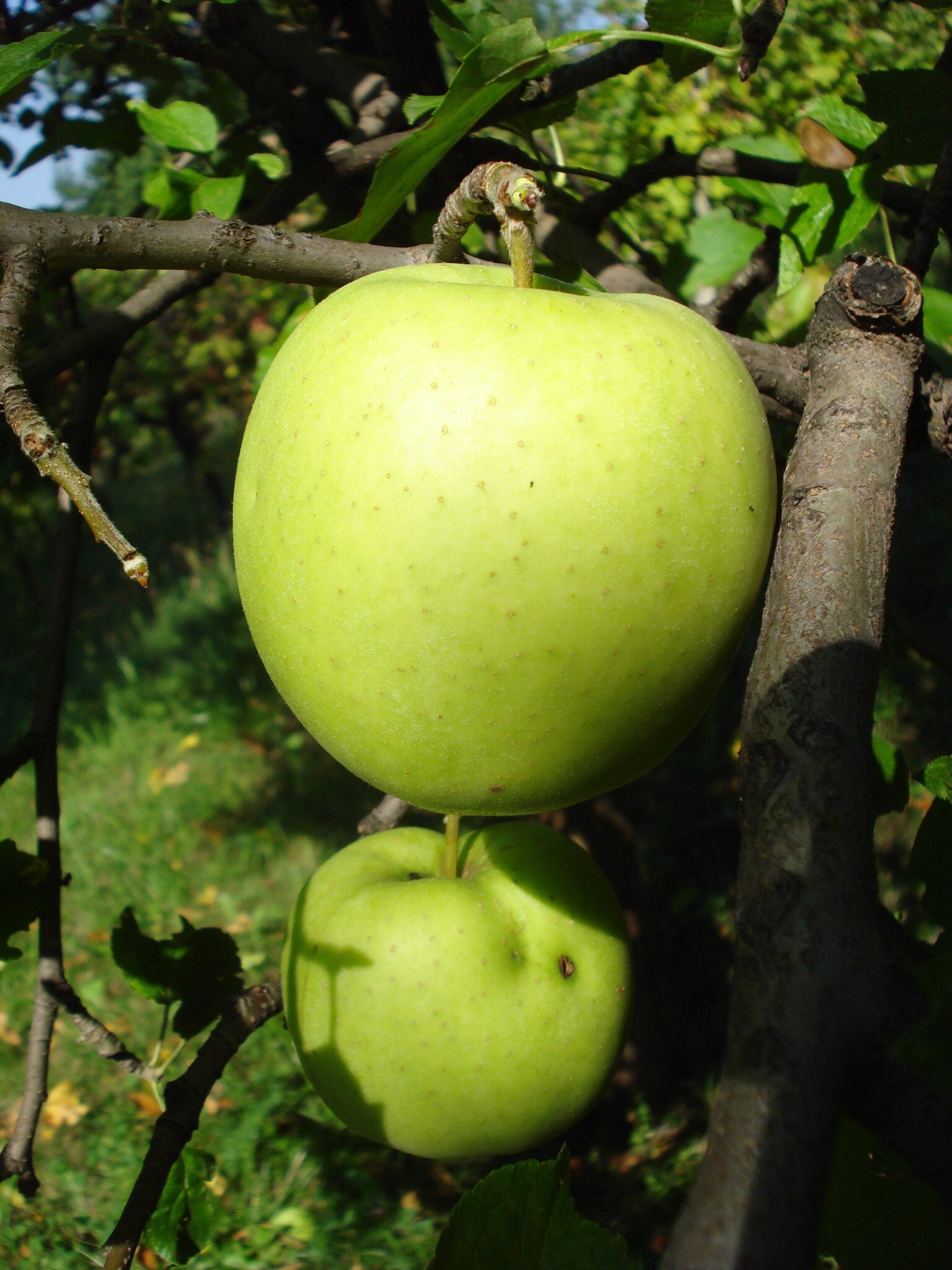
- Genus: Malus
- Species: Malus pumila
- Cultivar: 'Goldspur', a sport of 'Golden Delicious'
- Origin: 1960, USA

Goldspur or Golden Spur is a Golden Delicious-like apple cultivar that is spur bearing. It is a very compact tree, dwarf and column growing.

It is compatible for cross pollination with: 'Dorsett Golden', 'Ein Shemer', 'Gala', 'Liberty', 'Prime Gold' and 'Spartan'. Needs a lot of maintenance, but is highly rewarding.

== See also ==
- Fruit tree pruning
