= Delbard Jubilée =

Apple cultivar

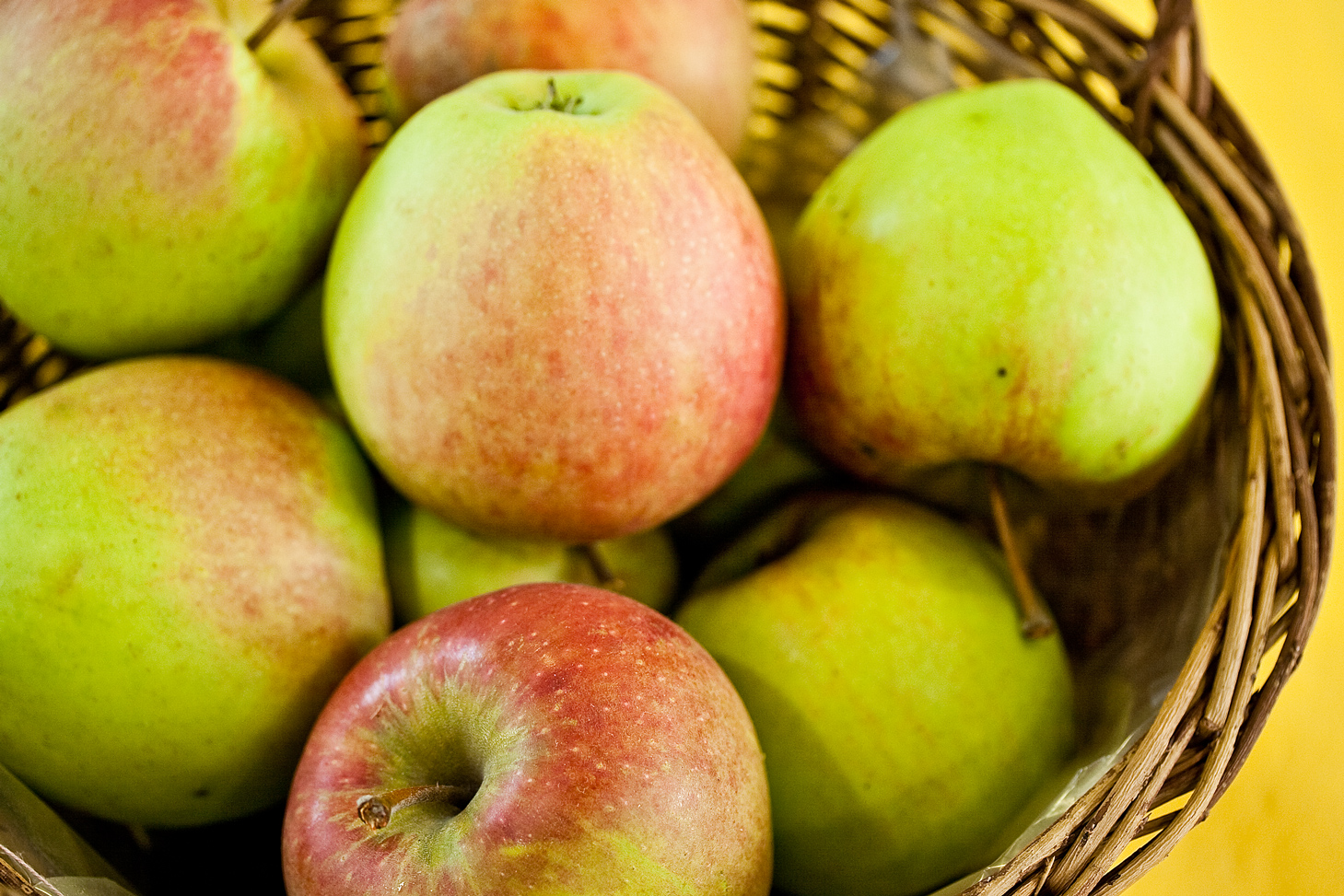
- Genus: Malus
- Species: Malus pumila
- Hybrid parentage: Golden Delicious x Lundbytorp
- Cultivar: 'Delbard Jubilée' or 'Delgollune'
- Origin: France, 1964

'Delbard Jubilée' or 'Delgollune' is a modern French cultivar of domesticated apple which was developed in 1964 by Delbard nurseries. It is not the same as the Jubilee apple that was developed in Canada.

'Delbard Jubilée' is the result of a cross between 'Golden Delicious' and 'Lundbytorp' apples. It bears a good crop of big sized fruit, skin background is straw yellow but is almost completely flushed with a vivid red. Some apple russet around the peduncle. Flesh is crispy with an excellent and pronounced flavor, a good balance of sweet and acid. It blossoms mid season and harvests in mid to late October. The apple will keep fresh until late March as it has generally good disease resistance.

The breeder Georges Delbard chose this cultivar out of his 1,200 crossings of apple cultivars that he had accomplished, to celebrate with it his 80th birthday and the 50th year of his nursery. According to a quote in the "Guide of Apples" website, he said:

"... it exhales a delicious floral odor. It liberates an aroma where you will find some touch of banana and hazelnut flowers ".

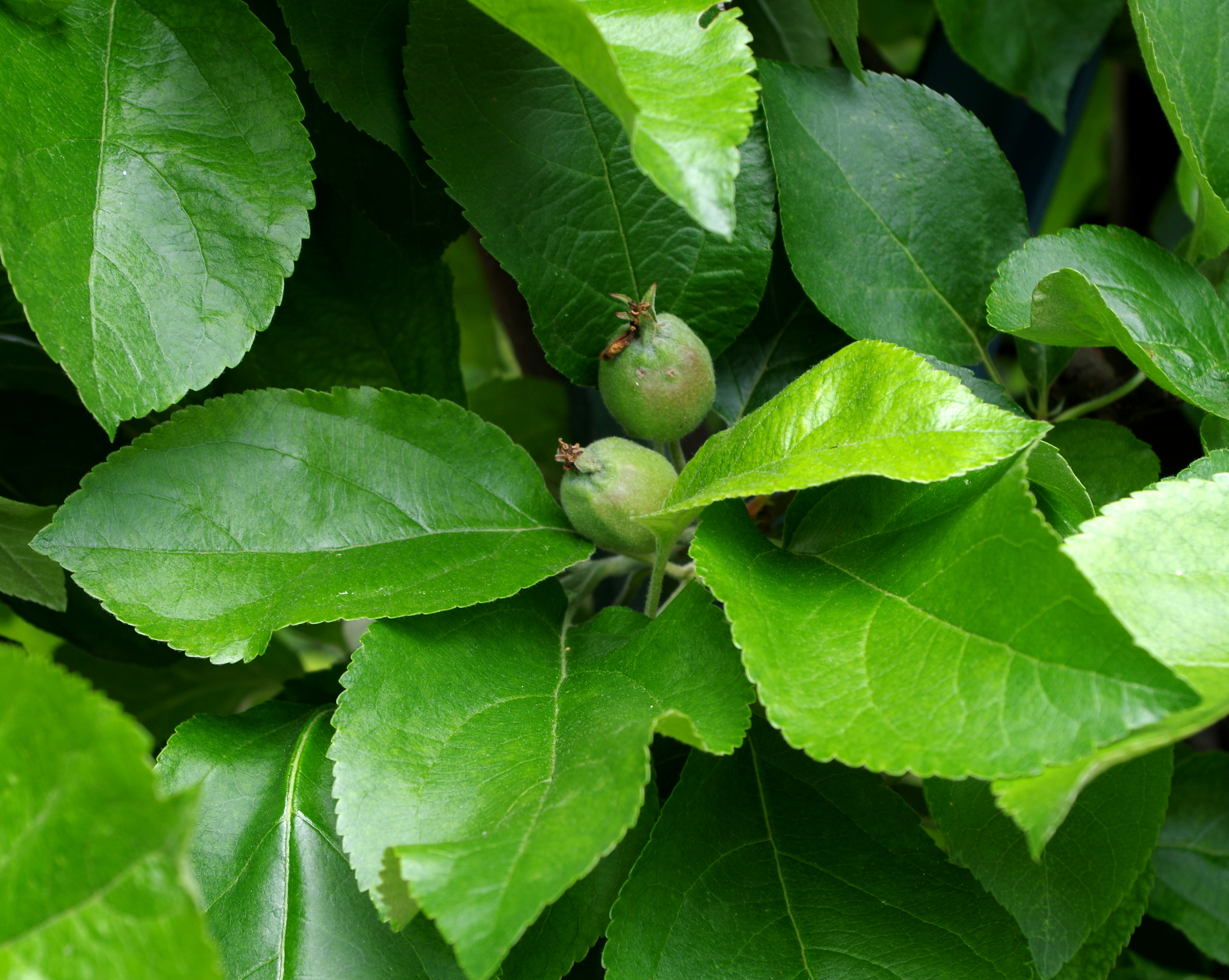
Fruitlets of 'Delbard Jubilée' on tree.
