= Jubilee apple =

Apple cultivar

Jubilee
- Species: Malus domestica
- Hybrid parentage: McIntosh × Grimes Golden
- Cultivar: Jubilee
- Breeder: R.C. Palmer
- Origin: (Canada) , Summerland, British Columbia, 1926

Jubilee apple is a modern cultivated variety of apple. It was developed by apple breeder R. C. Palmer in 1926 at the Dominion Experimental Farm, now the Summerland Research and Development Centre in British Columbia, Canada. It was selected in 1936 and commercially introduced in 1939.

The Jubilee is a cross between the McIntosh and Grimes Golden. It is a medium to large variety, with a somewhat irregular shape. Skin is flushed red over greenish yellow, marked with lenticels. Its flesh is creamy in colour, crisp, juicy, and fine-grained. It is a sweet and tart variety.

The Jubilee is harvest mid-season and keeps for up to three months in cold storage.

== See also ==
- List of Canadian inventions and discoveries
- Ambrosia (apple)
- McIntosh (apple)
- Spartan (apple)
- Delbard Jubilee
