= Pheasant's eye =

Pheasant's eye or pheasant's-eye is a common name for several plants with showy flowers and may refer to:

- Adonis, a genus of plants in the buttercup family (Ranunculaceae), particularly
  - Adonis annua, a plant with bright red flowers
- Narcissus poeticus, a species of daffodil
- Wyken Pippin, an apple cultivar also known as Pheasant's Eye
