= Pam's Delight =

Apple cultivar

Malus domestica "Pam's Delight"
- Genus: Malus sylvestris and Malus sieversii
- Species: Malus domestica
- Hybrid parentage: Unknown variety, apple pip
- Cultivar group: Self-sterile dessert apple
- Cultivar: "Pam's Delight"
- Breeder: Thomas Rivers of Sawbridgeworth, and Brogdale Farm, 1968
- Origin: Alfred Hull, Bedfordshire, England, 1956

Pam's Delight is an English cultivar of domesticated apple.

== Description ==
It is a self-sterile dessert apple, medium-sized with a red flush. Sweet in flavour with a crisp and juicy flesh. Harvests mid-October and available in England from October to November.

== History ==
Alfred Hull, a retired clerk, planted some apple pips in pots which he placed on his bathroom windowsill in 1956. He planted the most vigorous in his garden, in Luton, Bedfordshire. His daughter, Pam, teased her father by telling him that he should dig the tree up as it did not look as if it was capable of producing fruit. Pam developed Hodgkin's Disease, and Alfred told her that if his tree, which had become a family joke, ever bore fruit she would be the recipient of the first apple. In 1963, seven years after he planted the pip, the tree produced its first blossom, and from that, a single apple. He proudly presented it to Pam that October. Her illness became more severe, and she died, at the age of 28 the following April, just as the tree blossomed fully for the first time. That year the tree produced twenty-two pounds of apples.

== Production ==
In 1968, Brogdale Farm accepted Pam's Delight for full commercial trials. Later that year it was included in the National Register.

== Collections ==
This uncommon apple can be seen at Bide-a-While landscaped garden at Boggs Mead in the Lea Valley.
