= Filippa (apple) =

Apple cultivar

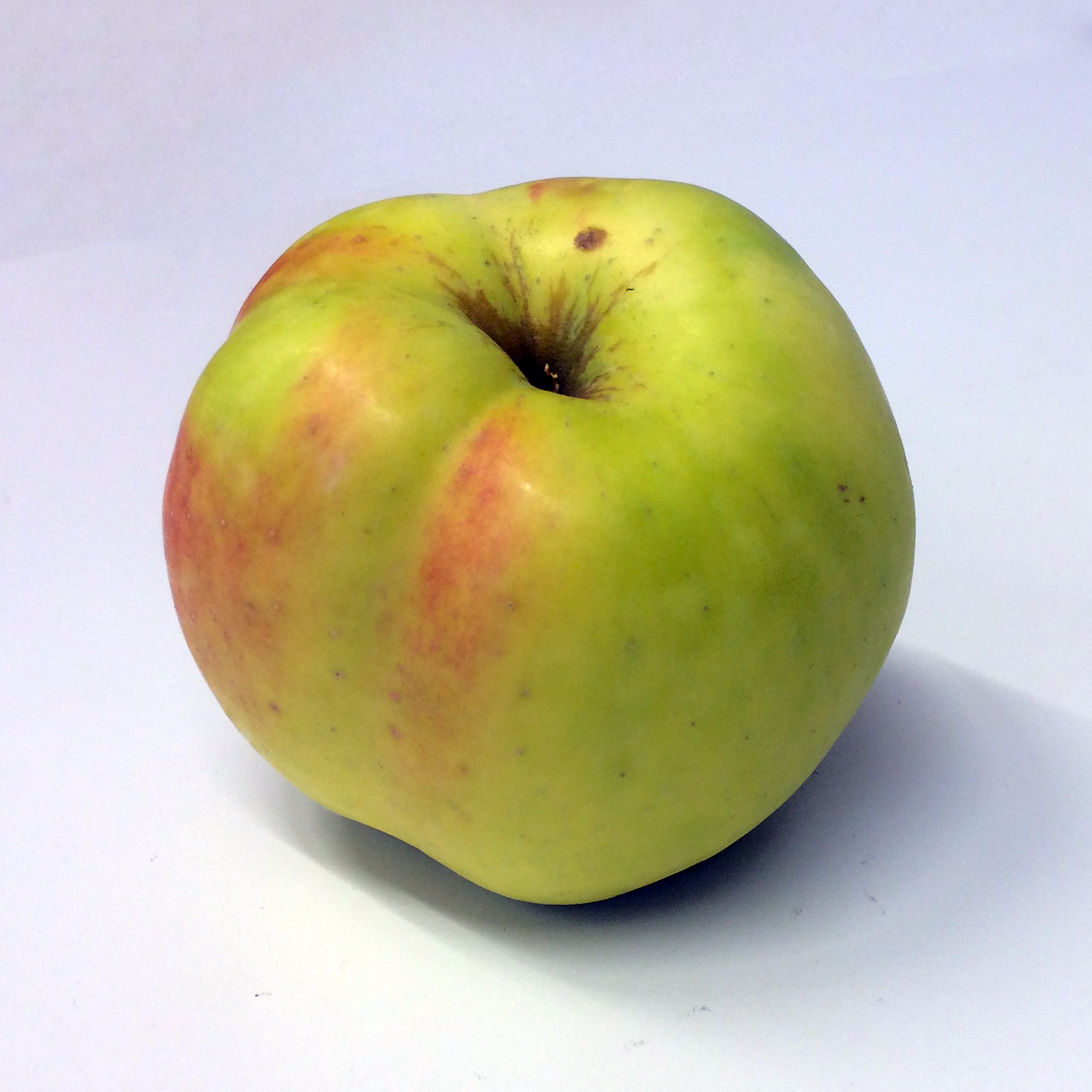
Filippa apple

Filippa is a Danish apple cultivar, created by schoolgirl Filippa Johannsen (1842–1930) in Hundstrup, on the island of Funen. Some sources say the apple originates in 1850; other sources say 1881.

Sonneruplund recommends this apple variety for private gardens, as it can be grown without the use of pesticides; it can make both an eating and a cooking apple.
