= Liberty (apple) =

Apple cultivar

Malus domestica 'Liberty'
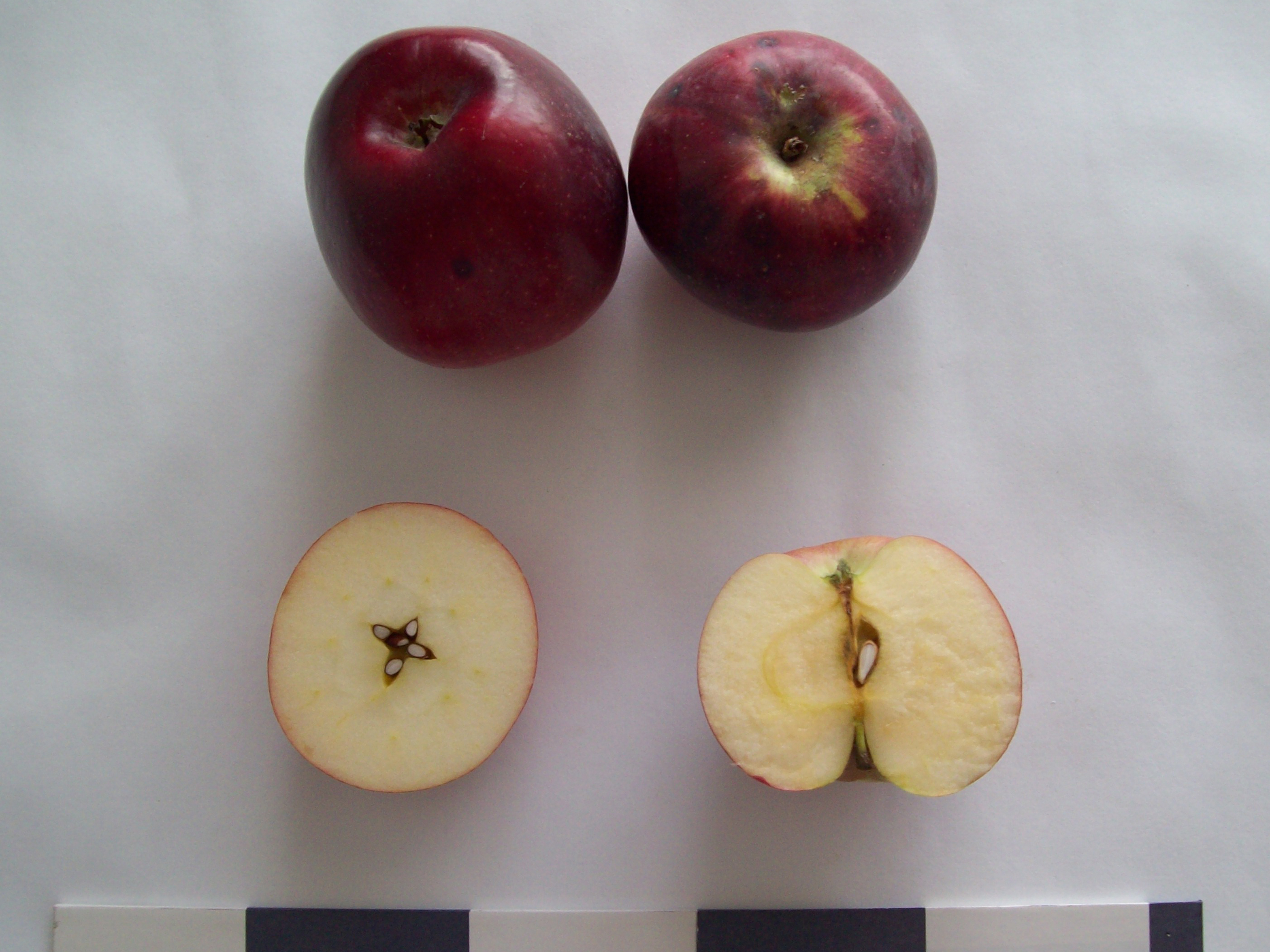
- Hybrid parentage: 'Macoun' × 'Purdue 54-12'
- Cultivar: 'Liberty'
- Origin: New York, United States, 1955

Liberty is a hybrid apple cultivar developed by the New York State Agricultural Experiment Station. It was a seedling produced in 1955 from pollinating 'Macoun' from 'Purdue 54-12' for the sake of acquiring Malus floribunda disease resistances. It was first released to the public in 1978.

== Official description ==
"The fruit of 'Liberty' is a deep dark red over 90 percent of the surface. The ground color is yellowish. The red is striped rather than blushed. The shape of the fruit is oblate to oblate conic, and the size averages 2 3/4–3 inches although it may be smaller on heavily cropping trees. The cavity is obtuse, broad, smooth to slightly russeted. The stem is short. The calyx is medium large and mostly closed.

There are numerous light colored small sunken dots on the surface of the fruit. The flesh is yellowish in color, juicy, crisp, fine. The flavor is subacid and good. The core is medium large and is slightly to wide open. The quality has been rated as good. At Geneva, it is ripe about October 5 on the average or about 10 days after Mclntosh. 'Liberty' is considered to be primarily a dessert apple and has not as yet been given a processing test."

It makes a fine pinkish applesauce.

== Disease susceptibility ==
- Scab: not susceptible
- Powdery mildew: low
- Cedar apple rust: low
- Fire blight: low
