= Blenheim Orange =

Apple cultivar

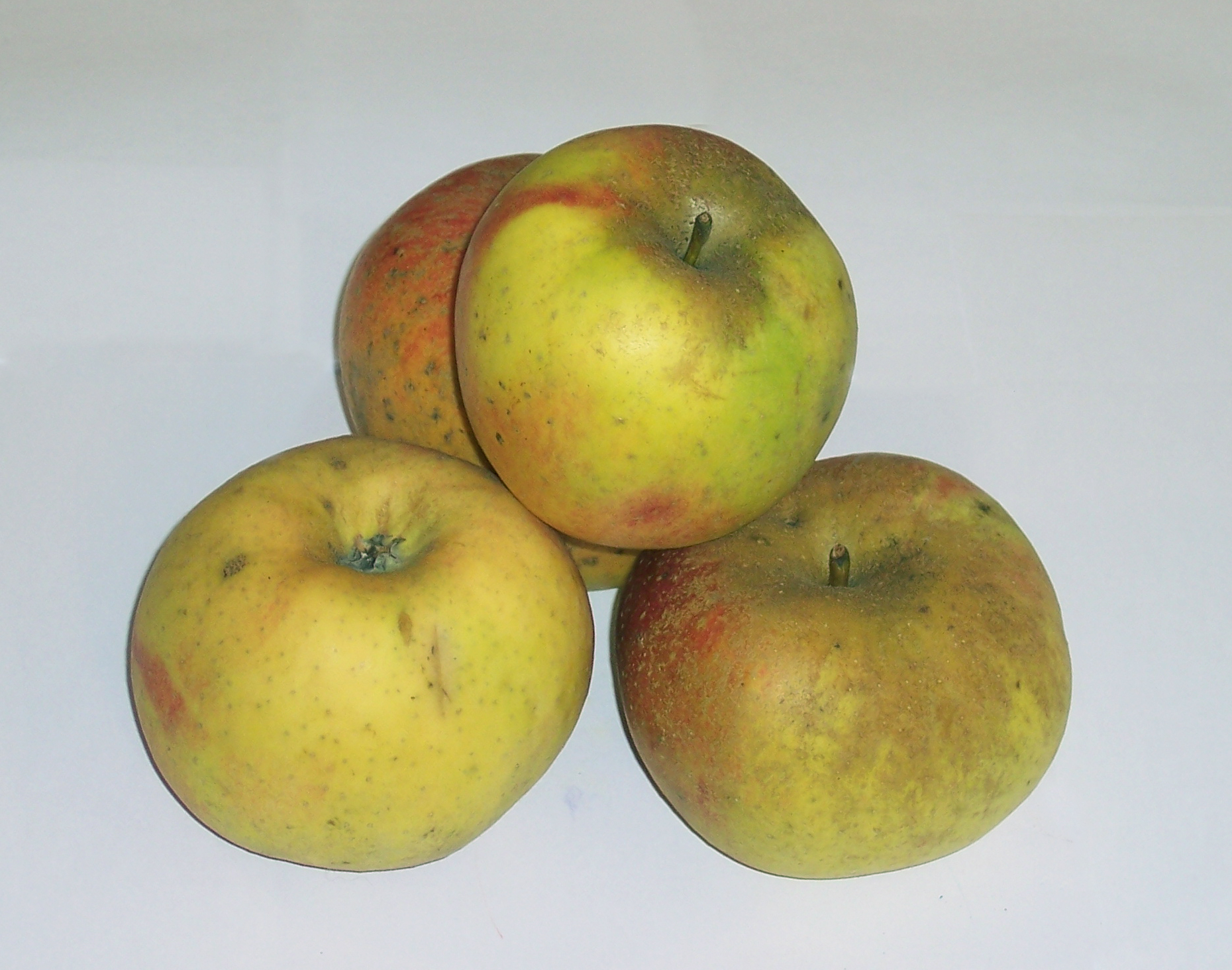
- Live photo of Blenheim Orange apple.
- Genus: Malus
- Breeder: George Kempster
- Origin: Woodstock, Oxfordshire, England 1740

Blenheim Orange (Kempster's Pippin) is a cultivar of apple. It was found in Old Woodstock, a suburb of Woodstock, Oxfordshire near Blenheim in England in about 1740. It is considered a dual-purpose apple, usable from late September as a cooking apple, and from October to January as an eating apple.

A tailor named George Kempster planted the original kernel and the apple, known locally as Kempster's Pippin, in his garden at 5 Manor Road, Old Woodstock. It began to be catalogued in about 1818 and it received the Banksian Silver Medal in 1820 and thereafter spread through England to Europe and America.

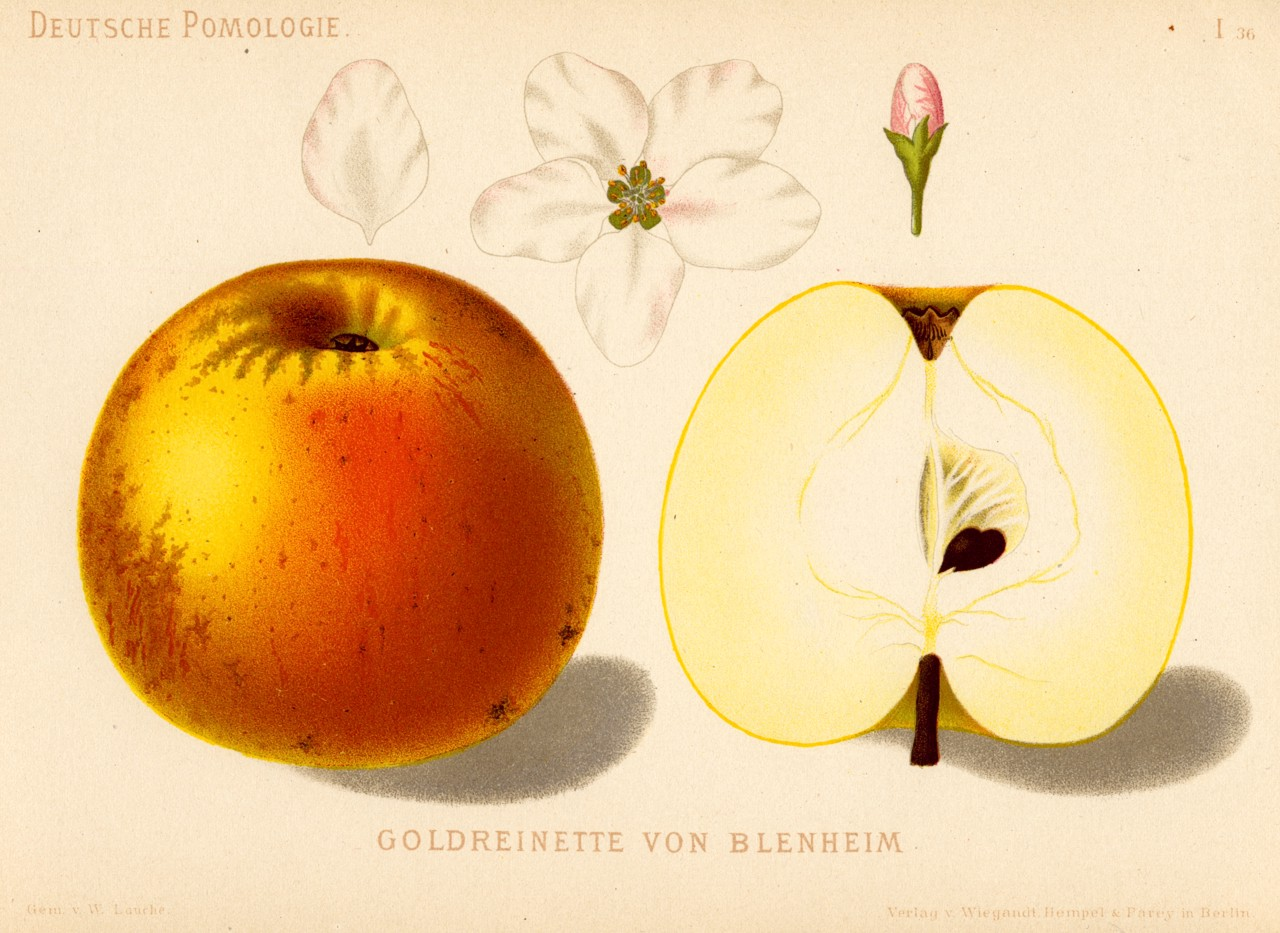
A Blenheim Orange in Deutsche Pomologie.

This apple has a greenish-yellow to orange skin streaked with red. It has a distinctive nutty flavour and is excellent for cooking. Blenheim Orange does not hold its shape, rather, it produces a fine puree as it cooks.

Typical of triploid apple varieties, Blenheim Orange is a very vigorous tree, and on standard rootstock can grow in excess of 30 feet tall. It is slow to come into production, but will then produce heavily. Fruit needs to be thinned heavily to control its biennial habit.

== Chemical composition ==
Sugar 12 - 13.75%, acid 5.6 - 11 g/litre, pectine 0.43%, vitamin C 12mg/100g.
