= Ambrosia (apple) =

Apple cultivar

Malus domestica
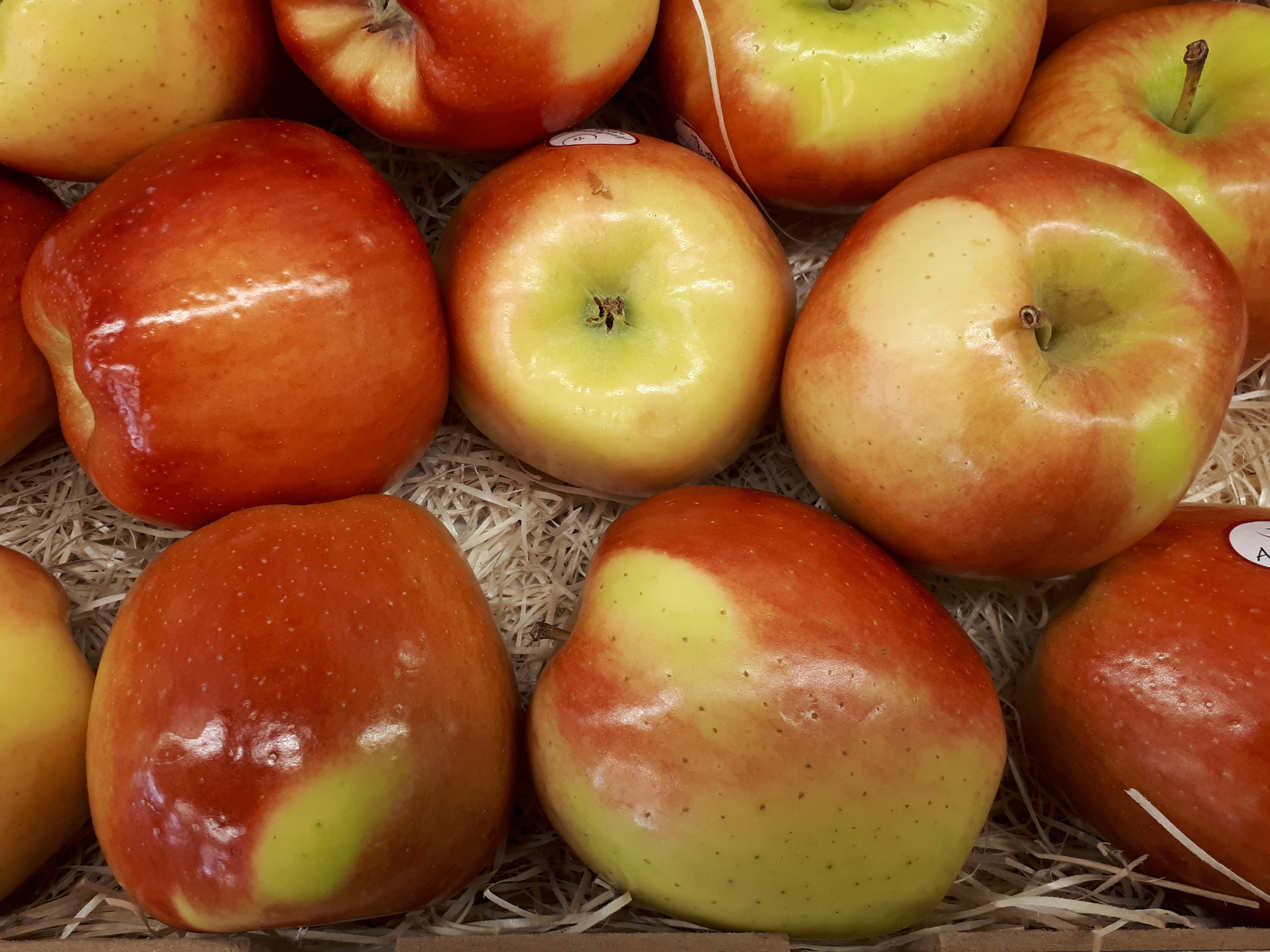
- Species: Malus domestica
- Hybrid parentage: Chance seedling
- Cultivar: Ambrosia™
- Origin: (Canada) Cawston, British Columbia, 1990s

Ambrosia is a cultivated variety or cultivar of apple originating in Canada in the early 1990s. The original tree was first cultivated by the Mennell family of Cawston, British Columbia, who discovered it growing from a chance seedling in their orchard in a row of Jonagold apple trees. It is named after the mythical food of the Greek gods.

Its colour, juice content, sweetness, and overall flavour have made the Ambrosia popular in numerous countries.

== Description ==
=== Tree ===
The Ambrosia apple tree has an upright growth pattern, varying on soil quality, rootstock, environment, and management. The tree develops lateral branches, requiring pruning to maintain vigour and fruit size. In the first two years of growth, significant tree training is needed to assure well-angled fruiting branches and productivity.

Ambrosia apple trees are suitable for dense planting, have high yields, and require little pruning during the winter.

Pollinating partners of the Ambrosia include the Cortland, Fuji, and Granny Smith.

=== Apple ===
The fruit is medium to large, 6.8–7.5 cm (2.7–3.0 in) in diameter, weighing about 215 grams (0.474 lb), and has mostly red, glossy colouration, with yellow patches. It has cream-coloured, firm, and juicy texture, with a mild and sweet flavour reminiscent of pear and low acidity, with the flesh resisting oxidation, making it suitable for salads and fresh fruit displays. These apples flower in the mid-to-late blossom period, and are harvested in mid-to-late season (mid-September in its native Similkameen Valley of British Columbia; September to October in Ontario, and mid-October in Quebec). Ambrosia apples are harvested annually, and may require two pickings.

Ambrosia apples produce a low amount of ethylene, not displaying the usual climacteric rise at harvest. Accordingly, internal ethylene concentrations do not indicate accurate fruit maturity, whereas skin colour and starch staining charts are commonly used for optimal harvest and standardization of fruit quality. This variety stores well in controlled atmosphere.

Orchard irrigation conditions appear to be a factor causing soft scald and reduced quality of Ambrosia apples during storage.

== Parentage ==
Derived from a chance seedling, the Ambrosia is suspected to be a cross of the Starking Delicious and the Golden Delicious because those apples existed in the orchard where the Ambrosia was discovered growing.

== Patent ==
Ambrosia is a "club" variety of apple, in which a cultivar is patented by an organization that sets quality standards and provides marketing, while production is limited to club members.

Centralized control allowed limitation of color variation to pink/red, as the variety would colour differently in warmer climates. The patent expired in Canada in 2015, in the United States in 2017, and in Chile in 2021. It remains active in many other countries until as late as 2034. While under patent in Canada, the Mennell family obtained plant breeders rights, and all growers were allowed, paying a royalty of CA$2–3.75 per tree planting. While under patent in the US, growers paid the lesser of US$1 per tree planting or US$1,000 per acre, and a US$1,000 franchise fee.

The Ambrosia Gold is marketed as the premium version of this variety.

== Cultivation and consumption ==
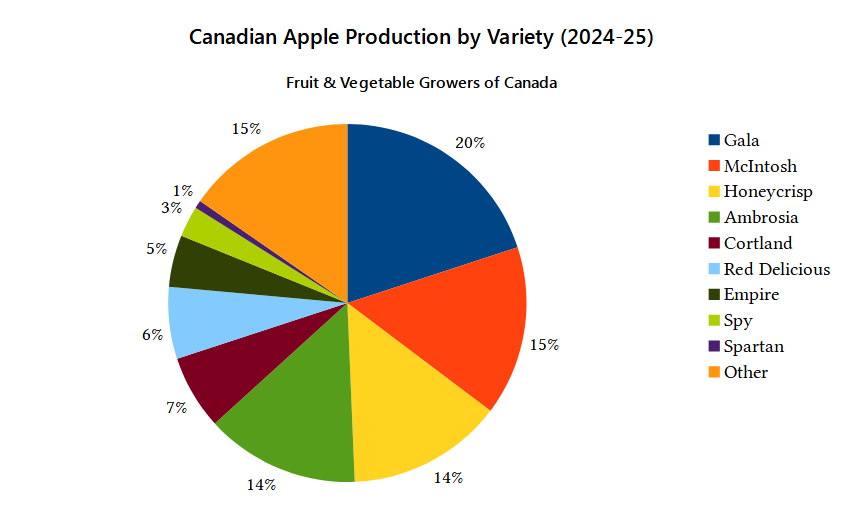
The Ambrosia is one of the most produced apple varieties in Canada, as of 2024.

In Canada, the Ambrosia is most commonly cultivated in British Columbia, where it was the third most-produced apple in 2016. By the mid-2020s, British Columbia continues to take the lead in production, followed by Ontario and Nova Scotia. In Quebec, farmers have been modernizing their orchards in order to increase production and sales of the Ambrosia in their province. Alongside the Honeycrisp and Gala, the Ambrosia has risen in prominence among Canadian farmers and consumers at the expense of the Red Delicious. In the United States, the majority of Ambrosia apples are harvested in Washington State and New York. This variety is also grown in Chile, New Zealand, the Netherlands, and Italy, among other countries.

In the early 21st century, it is one of the most popular apple varieties in Canada and the United States, especially in the South and Midwest. It has also found success in the Asian market, notably Vietnam.

== See also ==
- List of Canadian inventions and discoveries
- Jubilee apple
- McIntosh (apple)
- Spartan (apple)
