= Hundstrup =

- Town
- Location in the Region of Southern Denmark
- Coordinates: 55°6′12″N 10°25′54″E
- Country: Denmark
- Region: Southern Denmark
- Municipality: Svendborg

Population (2026)
  - Total: 240
- Time zone: UTC+1 (CET)
  - Summer (DST): UTC+2 (CEST)

Hundstrup is a small town situated on the island of Funen in south-central Denmark, in Svendborg Municipality. It is located four kilometers north of Vester Skerninge and 14 kilometers northwest of Svendborg.

The apple variety Filippa originated in Hundstrup.

== Den Selvforsynende Landsby ==
Den Selvforsynende Landsby (English: "The Self-sufficient Village") is an ecovillage situated in Hundstrup. The village was founded in 2002 with the intention of creating a community using permaculture techniques and the project began in 2004 when farmland outside of Hundstrup was purchased. As of 2014, the village has a population of about 65.
