= Spartan (apple) =

Apple cultivar

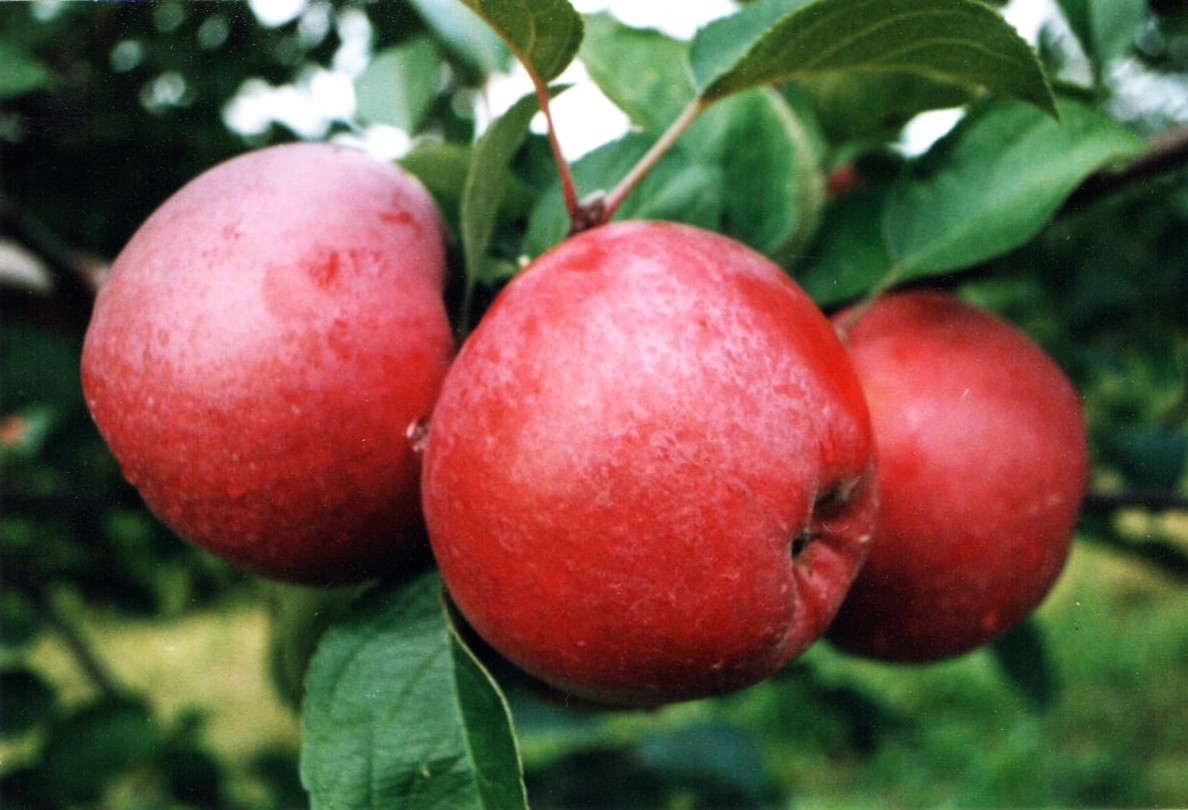
- Species: Malus pumila
- Hybrid parentage: McIntosh × Unknown
- Cultivar: Spartan
- Origin: (Canada) Summerland, British Columbia, 1936

The Spartan is a cultivated variety or cultivar of apple developed by R. C Palmer and introduced in 1936 from the Federal Agriculture Research Station in Summerland, British Columbia, now known as the Pacific Agri-Food Research Centre - Summerland. The Spartan is notable for being the first new breed of apple produced from a formal scientific breeding program. The apple was initially believed to be a cross between two North American cultivars, the McIntosh and the Newtown Pippin, but subsequent genetic analysis revealed that the Newtown Pippin was not one of the parents. The identity of this parent remains a mystery. The Spartan is considered a good all-purpose apple. The apple is of medium size and has a bright-red blush, but can have background patches of greens and yellows.

During the 2020s, almost all of Canada's Spartan apples are grown in British Columbia. In Quebec, it remains one of the most grown varieties.

== Disease susceptibility ==
- Scab: high
- Powdery mildew: high
- Cedar apple rust: high
- Fire blight: medium

== Sports and descendants ==
- Hunter Spartan, a tetraploid form of Spartan

== Gallery ==
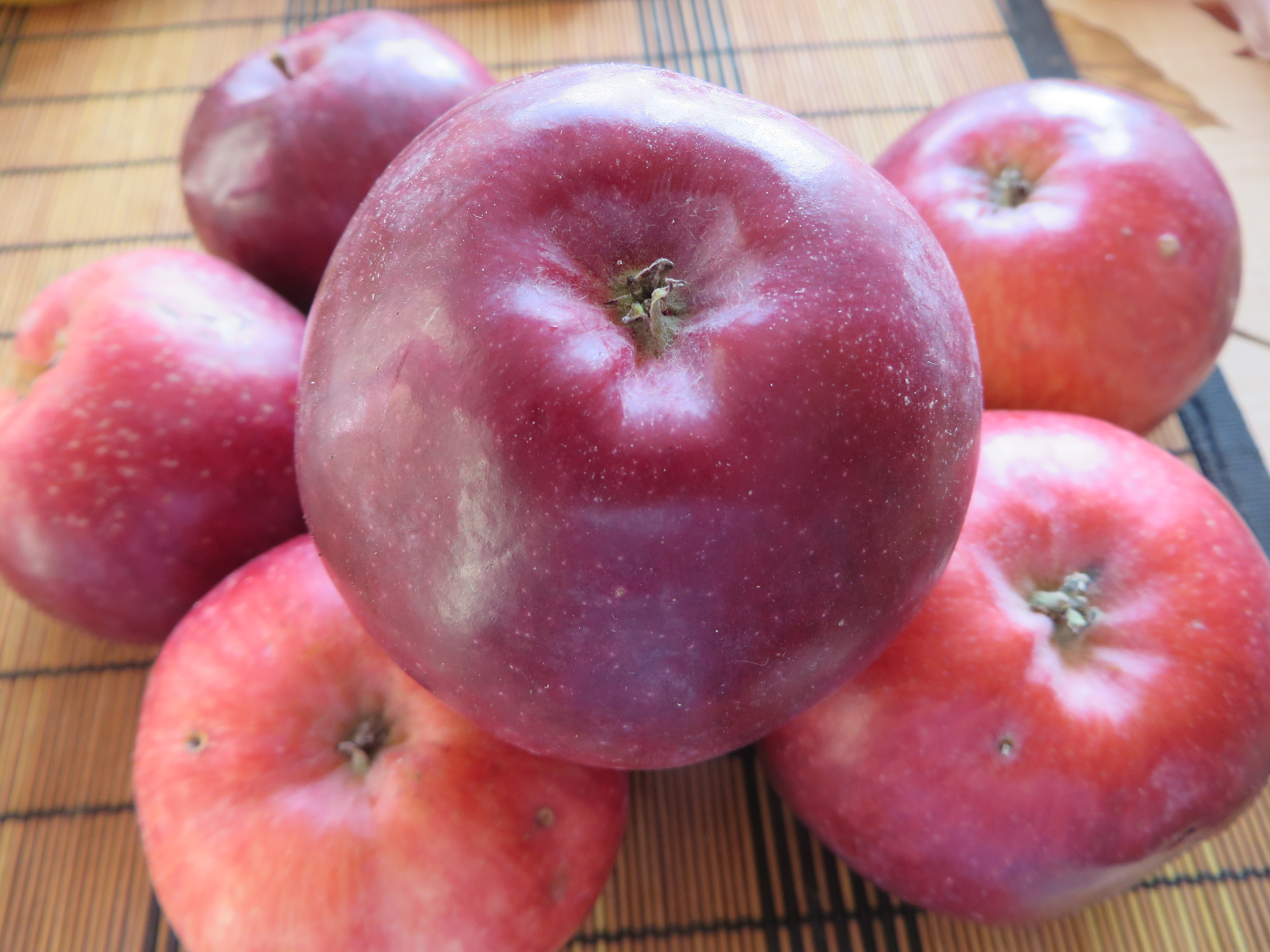
Apple from Chernihiv, Ukraine, 2014

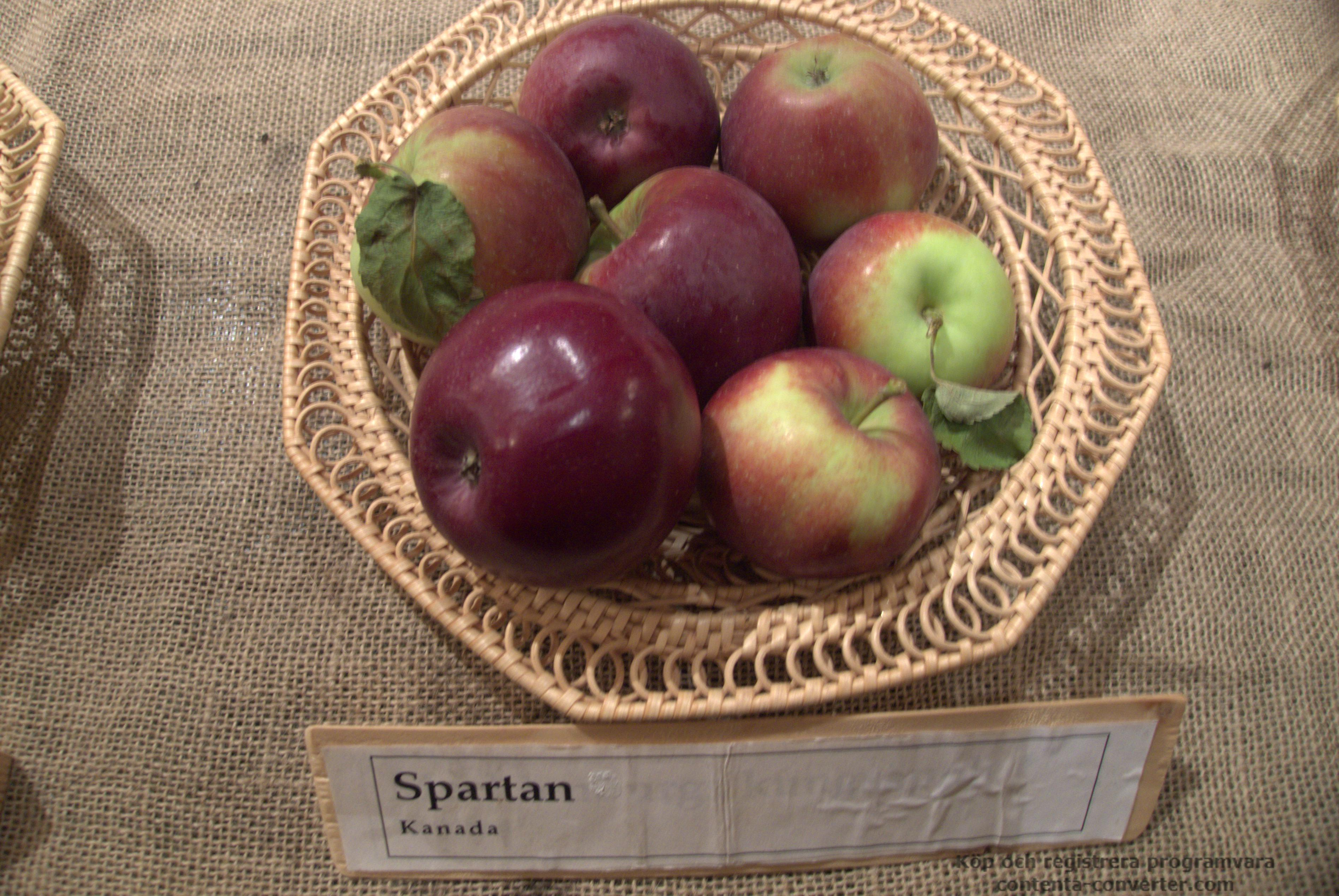
Greener apples grew in the shadows

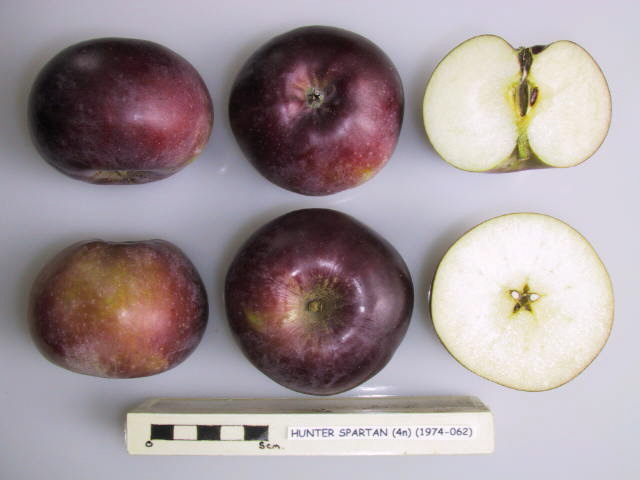
Hunter spartan

== See also ==
- List of Canadian inventions and discoveries
- Ambrosia (apple)
- Jubilee apple
