= Golden Delicious =

Apple cultivar

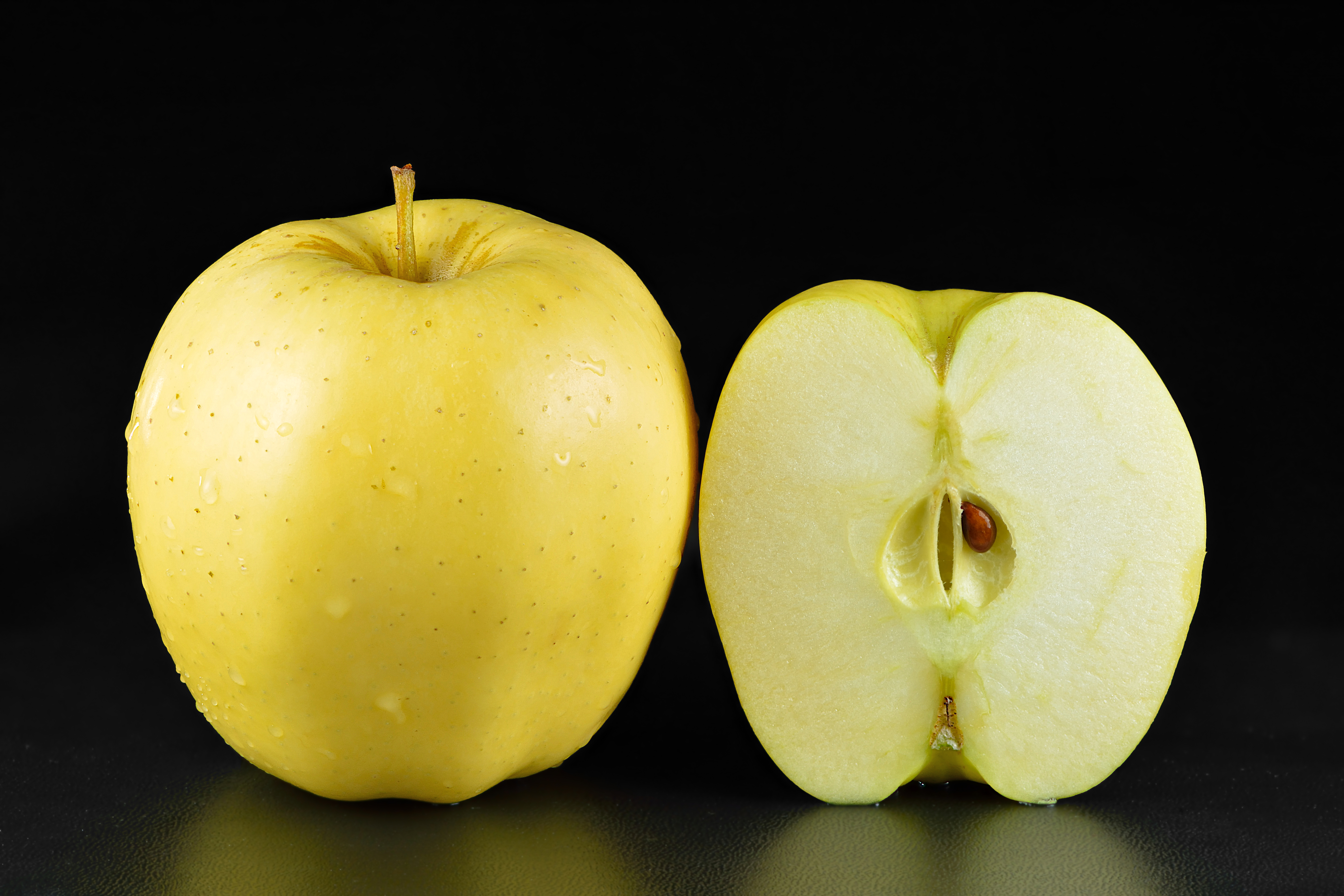
- Species: Malus domestica
- Hybrid parentage: Grimes Golden × ?
- Cultivar: Golden Delicious
- Origin: (United States) Clay County, West Virginia, 1905

Golden Delicious is a cultivar of apple from the United States, where it is one of the top varieties. Despite its name, it is not closely related to Red Delicious.

== History ==
Golden Delicious arose from a chance seedling, possibly a hybrid of Grimes Golden and Golden Reinette. The original tree was found on the family farm of J. M. Mullins in Clay County, West Virginia, and was locally known as Mullins' Yellow Seedling. Mullins sold the tree and propagation rights to Stark Brothers Nurseries for $5000, which first marketed it as a companion of their Red Delicious in 1914. For much of the twentieth century, the Golden Delicious, the Red Delicious, and the Granny Smith were the top three apple varieties in the United States in terms of sales at supermarkets. According to the U.S. Apple Association, as of 2025, the Golden Delicious and two of its descendants, the Gala and Honeycrisp, remain in the top nine most popular varieties in that country.

Golden Delicious was designated the official state fruit of West Virginia by a Senate resolution on February 20, 1995. Clay County has hosted an annual Golden Delicious Festival since 1972. The Golden Delicious was one of four varieties honored by the United States Postal Service in a 2013 set of four 33¢ stamps commemorating historic strains, joined by the Northern Spy, Baldwin, and Granny Smith apples.

In 1943, the New York State Agricultural Experiment Station in Geneva, New York developed the Jonagold apple by cross-breeding Golden Delicious and Jonathan trees. The cultivar was officially released in 1968 and went on to become the leading apple cultivar in Europe. As of 2025, the Golden Delicious is still one of the top apples in the European Union.

In 2010, an Italian-led consortium announced they had decoded the complete genome of the Golden Delicious apple. It had the highest number of genes (57,000) of any plant genome studied to date.

== Appearance and flavor ==
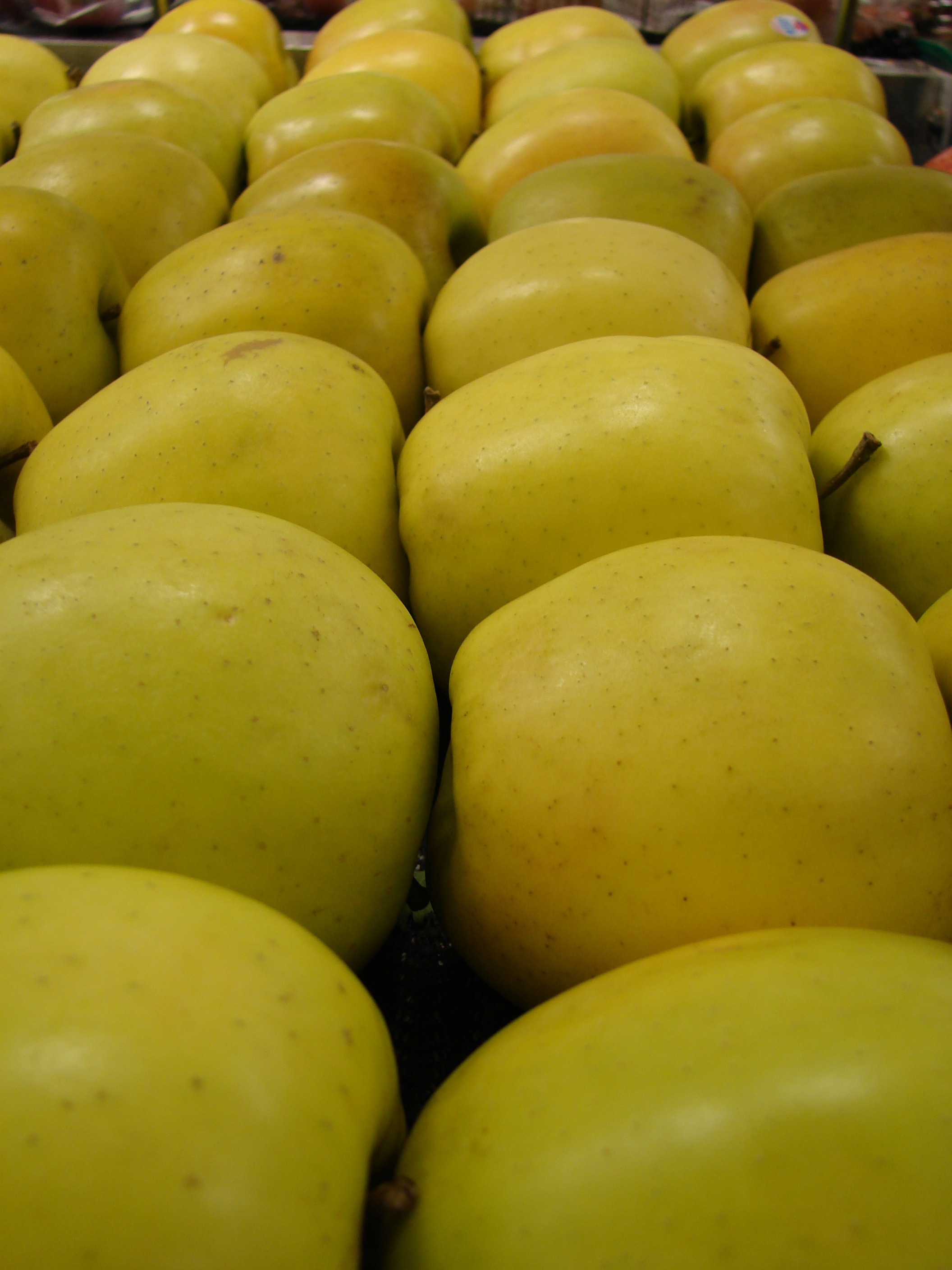
Color is uniform yellow, with an occasional red blush

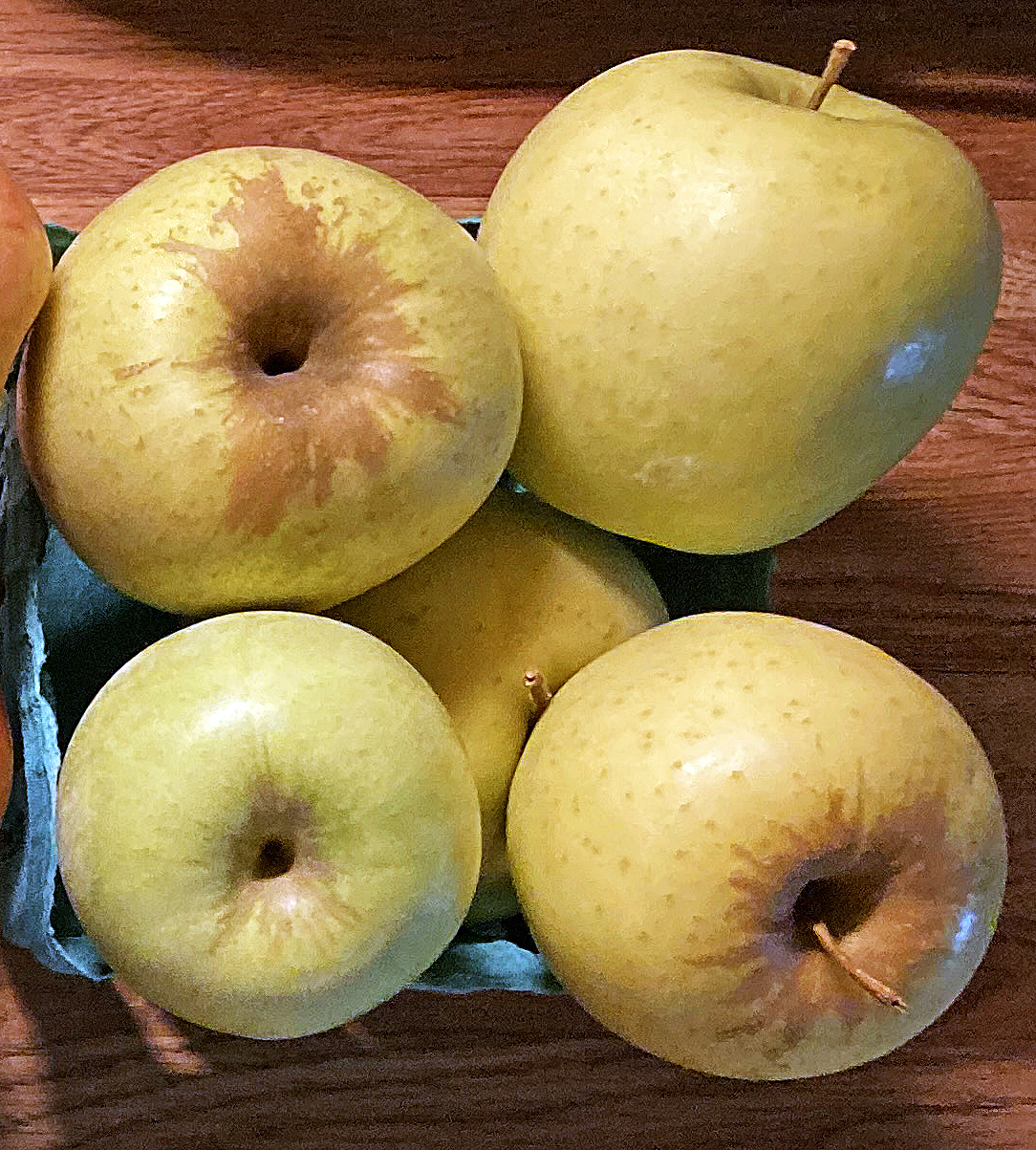
Golden delicious apples generally are of uniform color but can show considerable russeting around the stem end of the fruit. Grown in Albemarle County, Virginia.

Golden Delicious is a large, yellowish-green skinned cultivar and very sweet to the taste. It is prone to bruising and shriveling, so it needs careful handling and storage. It is a favorite for eating plain, as well as for use in salads, apple sauce, and apple butter. America's Test Kitchen, Food Network, and Serious Eats all list Golden Delicious apples as one of the best apples for baking apple pie due to its balanced flavor and its high pectin content that allows it to stay intact when cooked.

- Density 0.79 g/cc
- Sugar 13.5%
- Acid 5.6 gram/litre
- Vitamin C 10–20 mg/litre

Typical size distribution
55–60 mm	60–65 mm	65–70 mm	70–75 mm	75–80 mm	80–85 mm
5%	12%	33%	35 %	13%	2%

== Season ==
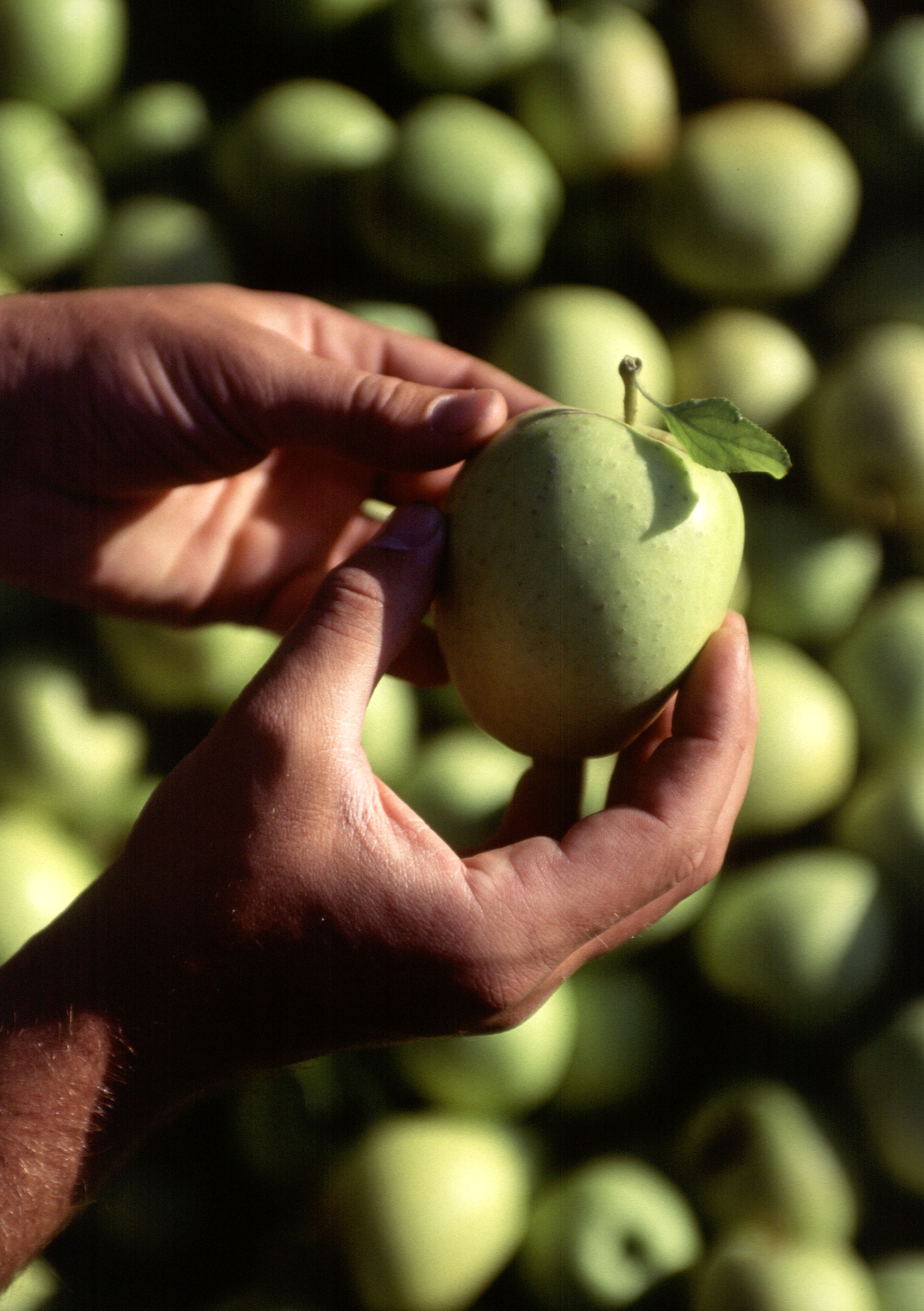
Speckles on the skin are normal

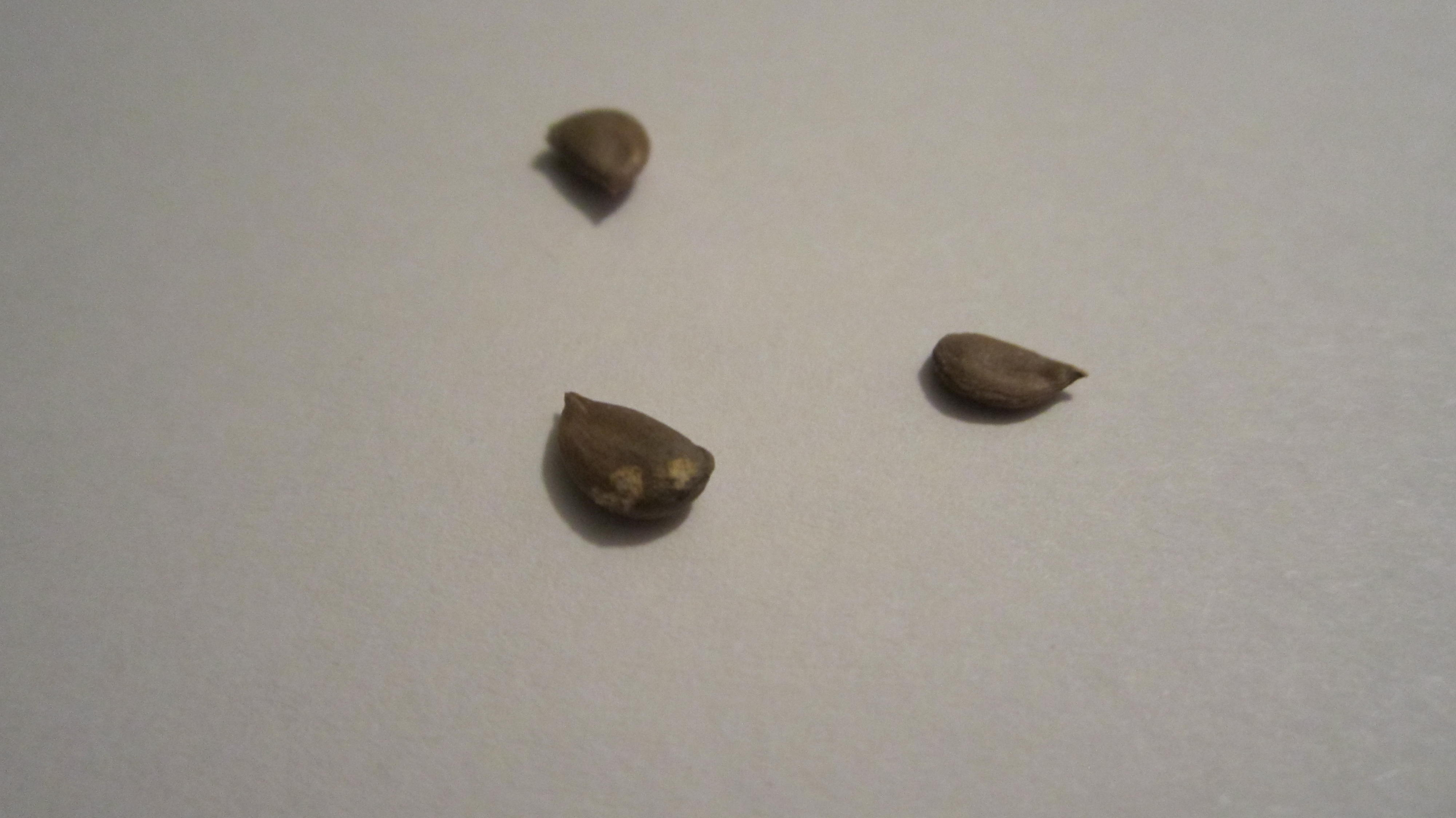
Seed

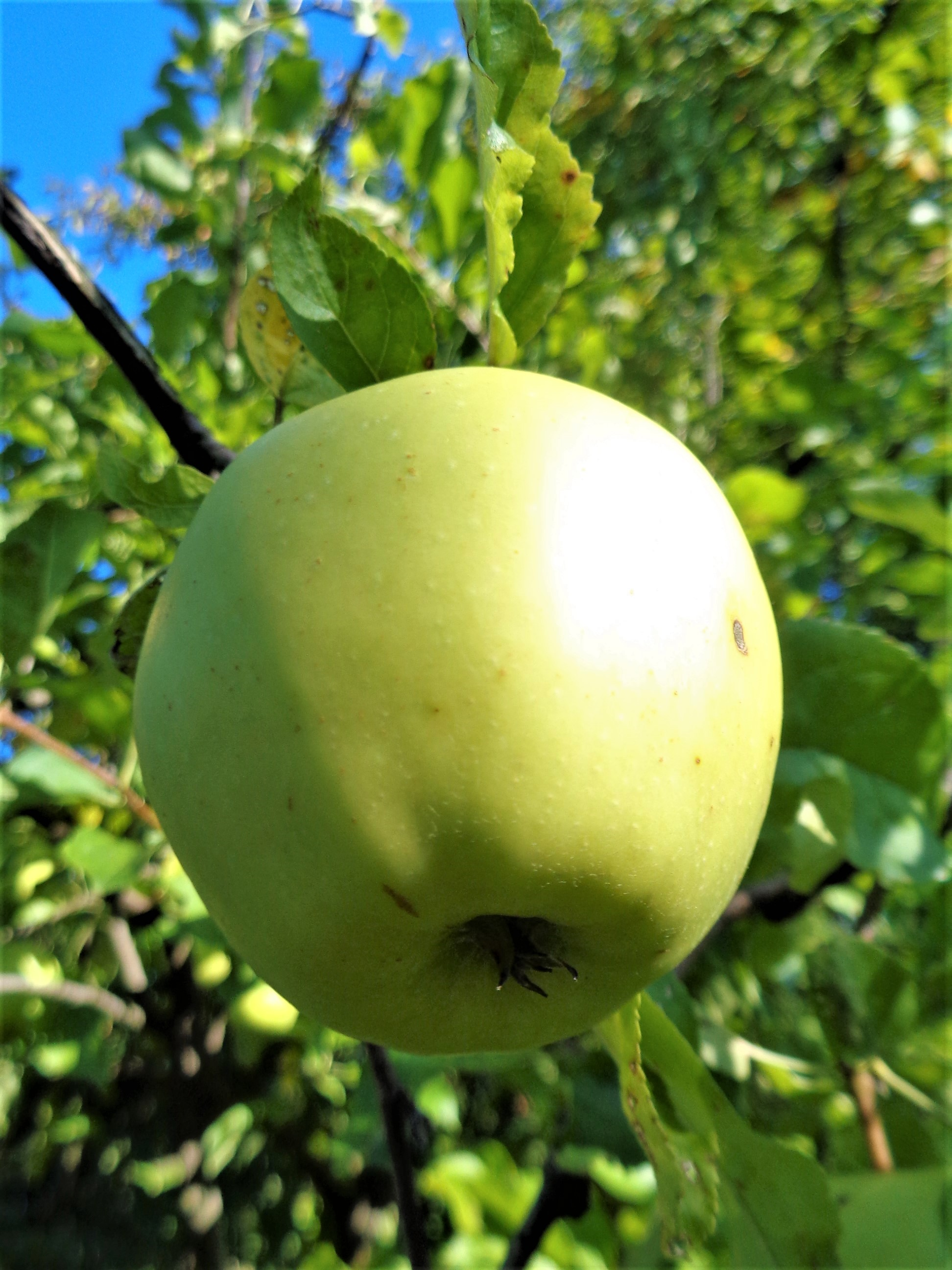
Golden Delicious clon B - ripening on a tree

Golden Delicious are harvested 130–150 days after full bloom.

=== Golden Delicious mutants ===
- Lucky Rose Golden A patented Golden Delicious mutant

=== Descendant cultivars ===
Descendent cultivars
Name	Parentage	Year: cross made/ selected/ introduced	Country of origin	Patent
Akita Gold	(Golden Delicious × Fuji)			
Ambrosia	Starking Delicious × Golden Delicious (suspected, chance seedling)	early 1990s	Canada	
Angold	(Antonovka x Golden Delicious)			
Annalee (Blount Golden)	Golden Delicious x ?	?/1962/?	USA	USPP 3496
Arlet	(Golden Delicious × Idared)			
Autumn Glory	Golden Delicious x Fuji	?/?/2011	USA	
Bohemia	(Lord Lambourne × Golden Delicious)			
Brock	Golden Delicious x McIntosh	1966	USA	
Cadel	(Jonathan × Golden Delicious)			
Cameo	(Golden Delicious × Red Delicious)	1987	USA	
Caudle	(Golden Delicious × Red Delicious)			
Champion	(Golden Delicious × Cox Orange)			
Chantecler	(Golden Delicious × Reinette Clochard)			
Cripps Pink (marketed as Pink Lady)	Golden Delicious × Lady Williams)	1973	Australia	
Dalitron	Golden Delicious x Pilot	1994/1997/	France	USPP
Delbarestivale	( Stark Jonagrimes x Golden Delicious)			
Elan	(Golden Delicious x James Grieve)	?/? /1984	Netherlands	
Elstar	(Ingrid Marie × Golden Delicious)	1955/ ? /1972	Netherlands	USPP 6450
Falstaff	James Grieve x Golden Delicious			
Firm Gold	(Starkspur Golden Delicious, U.S. PP 2024 × Starkrimson Red Delicious, U.S. PP 1565)			
Gala	Kidd's Orange Red × Golden Delicious	?/1939/1960	New Zealand	
Ginger Gold	Albemarle Pippin × Golden Delicious (suspected, chance seedling)	1960s	USA	
GoldRush (Coop 38)	Golden Delicious x Coop 17	? / ?/ 1993	USA	USPP
Goldspur a Golden Delicious-like cultivar from Holland which is spur bearing				
Goro	Golden Delicious x Swiss Orange	1951/ /1973	Switzerland	
Honeycrisp	(MN1627 [Golden Delicious × Duchess of Oldenburg] × Keepsake [Frostbite (MN447) x Northern Spy])	1960/1988/1991	USA	
Honeygold	Golden Delicious x Haralason			
Iduna	Golden Delicious × Glockenapfel			
Jonagold	Golden Delicious × Jonathan	1943/ /1968	USA	
Kissabel Jaune	Golden Delicious x SJ 109	2006/?/2011	France	USPP 30041
Kissabel Orange	Golden Delicious x SD 109	2006/?/2012	France	USPP 28201
Kizuri	Golden Delicious x NY75413-30	1990/?/?	Belgium	USPP 27926
Ligolina	Linda x Golden Delicious	?/1972/?	Poland	
Magnolia Gold	Golden Delicious x ?	? / ? /1970	USA	
Maigold	(Fraurotacher × Golden Delicious)	1944 / /1964	Switzerland	
Mutsu (apple)	Golden Delicious x Indo apple		Japan	
Opal (apple)	(Topaz × Golden Delicious)		Czech Republic	USPP 15963
Orin	Golden Delicious x Indo		Japan	
Ozark Gold	(Golden Delicious x (Conrad x Red delicious)			
Pinova	(Clivia × Golden Delicious)			
Rebella	Golden Delicious x Remo	?/1986/?	Germany	USPP 15134
Red Baron	Golden Delicious x Red van Buren	1926/1940/1969	USA	
Rubinette (Rafzubin)	(Golden Delicious × Cox Orange)		Switzerland	
Sekai Ichi	Golden Delicious × Red Delicious (suspected)	1930/?/1974	Japan	
Sinta	Golden Delicious x Grimes Golden	1955/1965/ ?	USA	
Spigold	(Northern Spy × Golden Delicious)			
Summerland	McIntosh x Golden Delicious	1926/1939/1969	Canada	
Sundance (Coop 29)	GD x 1050NJ-1	1964/1972/?	USA	USPP 13819
Sundowner	(Golden Delicious × Lady Williams)		Australia	USPP 8477
Swiss Gourmet	Golden Delicious x Idared	?/?/1984	Switzerland	USPP 6689
Tentation delblush	(Grifer' (Blushing Golden) × Golden Delicious)			
Trajan	Golden Delicious x Wijcik McIntosh	?/?/1989	UK	USPP 6226
Virginiagold	Albemerle pippin x Golden Delicious	1944/1956/ ?	USA	
