= Tentation =

Apple cultivar

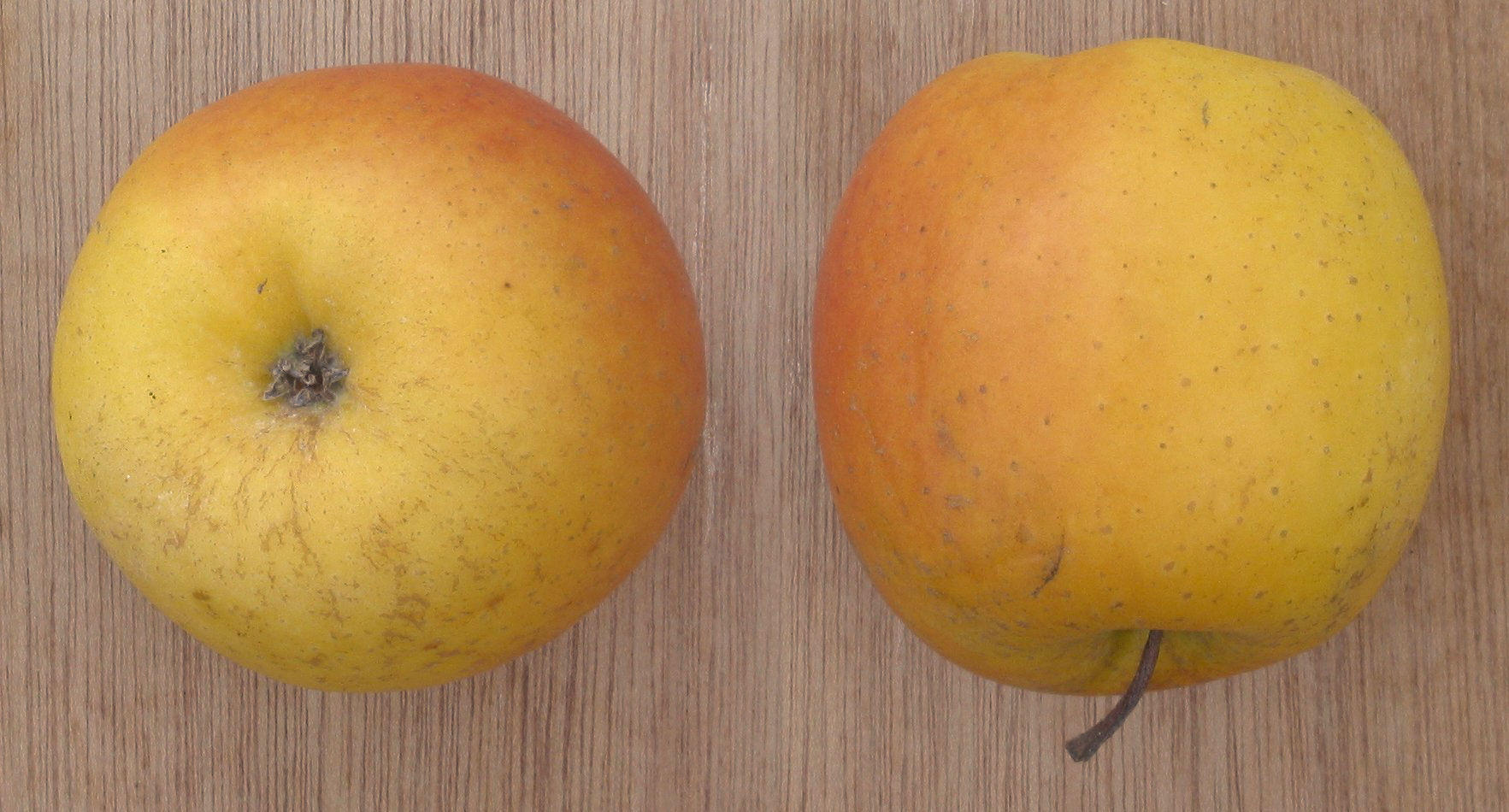
- Genus: Malus
- Species: Malus domestica
- Hybrid parentage: 'Grifer' ('Blushing Golden') × 'Golden Delicious'
- Cultivar: Tentation
- Origin: France, 1979

Tentation delblush is a commercial apple variety (also known as Delblush) that was created in France in 1979 by Georges Delbard as the result of a crossing of Grifer (Blushing Golden) × Golden Delicious.

New Zealand is the sole southern hemisphere grower of Tentation, providing fruit domestically and to the northern hemisphere from June to September. In the late 1990s, a selected group of New Zealand fruit growers started planting Tentation trees. It is also grown in the United Kingdom.
