= Cameo (apple) =

Apple cultivar

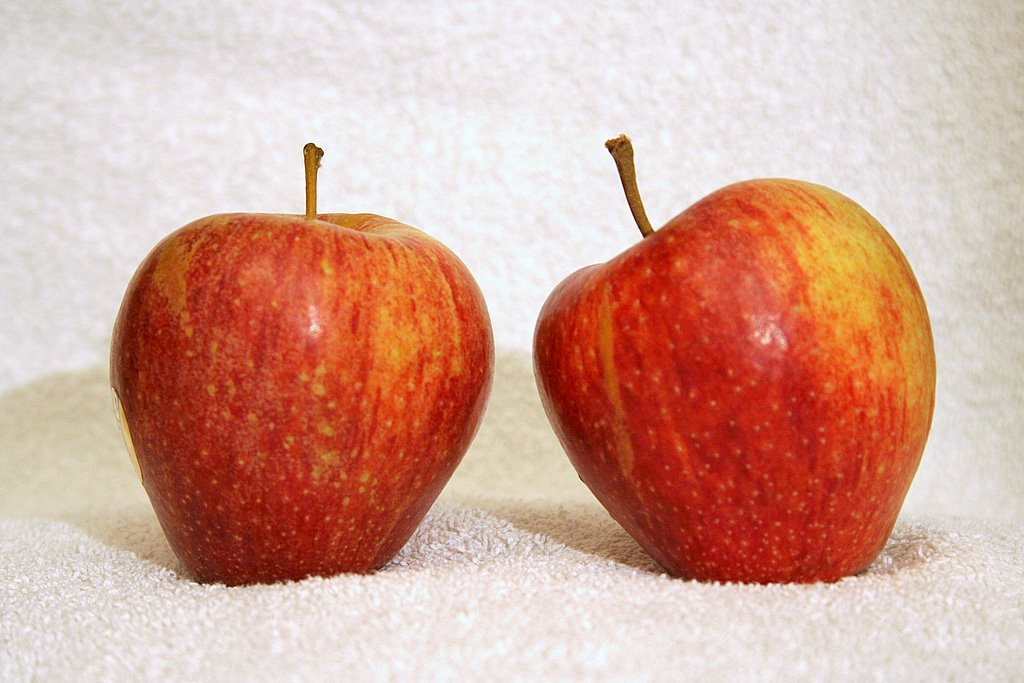
- Species: Malus domestica
- Hybrid parentage: Red Delicious × Golden Delicious (suspected)
- Cultivar: Cameo
- Origin: (United States) Dryden, Washington, 1987

'Cameo' is a cultivar of apple, discovered by chance by the Caudle family at their orchard in Dryden, Washington in 1987. Its parentage is uncertain but is thought to be a cross between Red Delicious and Golden Delicious, since it was found near orchards of those fruits. It also appears similar to the original Delicious cultivar. It has red skin with orange and yellow stripes; a dense texture; and a sweet, tart, crisp, and aromatic flavor. Suitable for eating fresh, salads, and baking, it is among the top nine most grown apples in Washington state. By the early 2010s, it has become widely grown across the United States. This variety stores well.
