= Ginger Gold =

Apple cultivar

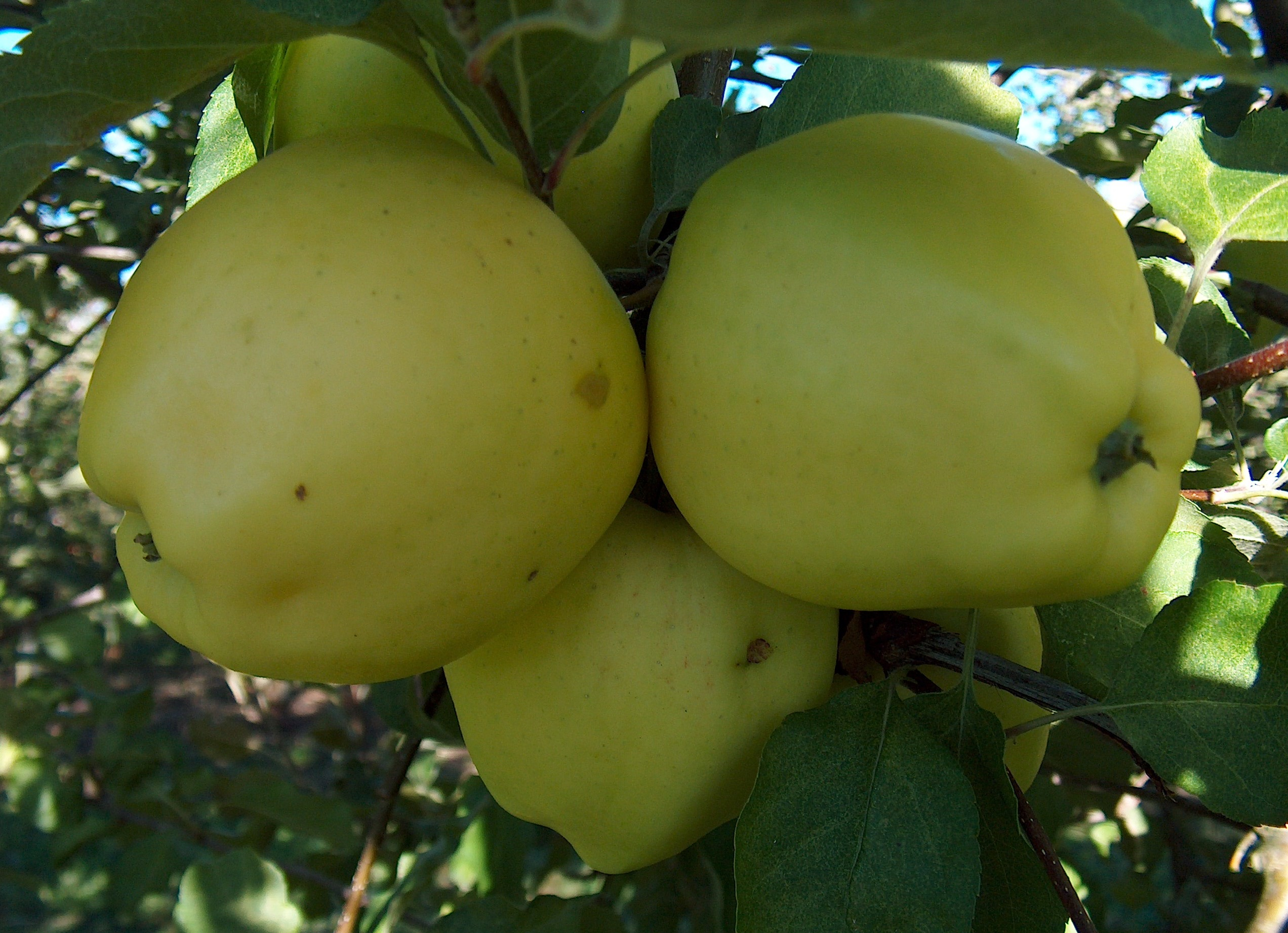
- Hybrid parentage: Golden Delicious × Albemarle Pippin × unknown
- Cultivar: Ginger Gold
- Origin: (United States) Nelson County, Virginia, 1969

Ginger Gold is a yellow apple variety originating from a chance seedling from the late 1960s and entered commerce in the 1980s, though the original seedling dates from the late 1960s. By the 2010s, it has become an important commercial variety.

== Characteristics ==
The Ginger Gold is one of the earliest commercial apple varieties to ripen; it does so before the Gala, Honeycrisp, and McIntosh. Harvest takes place in August in the Northeastern United States, mid-July in North Carolina, July in California, and early September in Ontario and Quebec. The fruit is large, conical and starts out a very pale green, though if left on the tree will ripen to a soft yellow with a slightly waxy appearance.

The Ginger Gold can be eaten fresh, as well as for making salad and pie. The flesh is creamy in color and resists browning more than most varieties. It is crisp and juicy, and is sweeter than tart. Slices maintain their shapes when cooked.

In a 1995 evaluation, the Virginia Extension Service held that "This is the best apple that we have evaluated that ripens before 'Gala'." In controlled-atmosphere storage it can last for about six months.

The trees are vigorous but very susceptible to fire blight and mildew.

== History ==
Ginger Gold is famous as the apple that Hurricane Camille brought forth. Camille brought devastating floods to Nelson County, Virginia in 1969, and the orchards of Clyde and Frances "Ginger" Harvey were badly washed out. In recovering the few surviving trees around the edge of one Winesap orchard, another tree was found which Clyde Harvey recognized as being different. It was planted with the rest, but was found to produce yellow rather than red fruit. An extension agent identified the parents as Golden Delicious, Albemarle Pippin, and some other unknown variety. The variety was eventually named after Clyde Harvey's wife.

During the 21st century, this has become an increasingly popular variety. It is the first yellow apple to ripen in the fall, and the quality and consistency of its bearing have suited it to commercial growing.

In January 2007, the Virginia General Assembly proposed a bill designating the Ginger Gold apple as the official fruit of Virginia. The bill was tabled in committee in late January.
