= Delbard =

French plant nursery

Delbard is a plant nursery in France known for breeding disease resistant apple and various roses. It was first founded by George Delbard in Malicorne, France around a century ago, and has continued to be tended to by his grandson and French governmental organizations.

== History ==
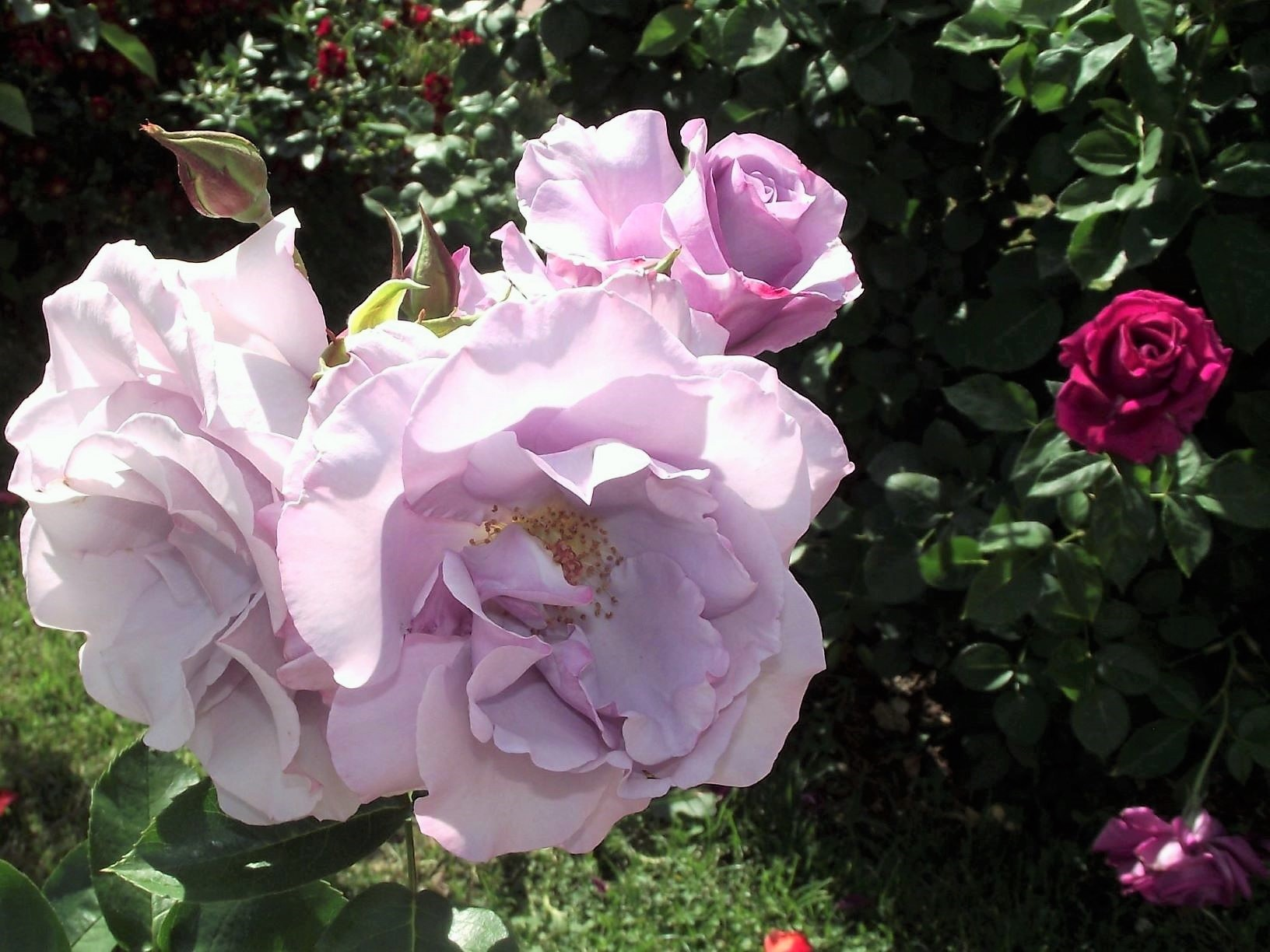
'Dioressence', a rose cultivar developed by 'Delbard' in 1984.

Delbard Nursery was founded by and named after George Delbard, who was breeding fruit trees more than seventy years ago, at his family farm in the area of Malicorne, Allier in central France. Later on, he added roses, dahlias, and other flowers to his breeding work. This business is continued and expanded by his grandson Arnaud Delbard, who is working close with the Institut national de la recherche agronomique which is a French governmental organization, as well as with other international collaboration for global selective breeding.

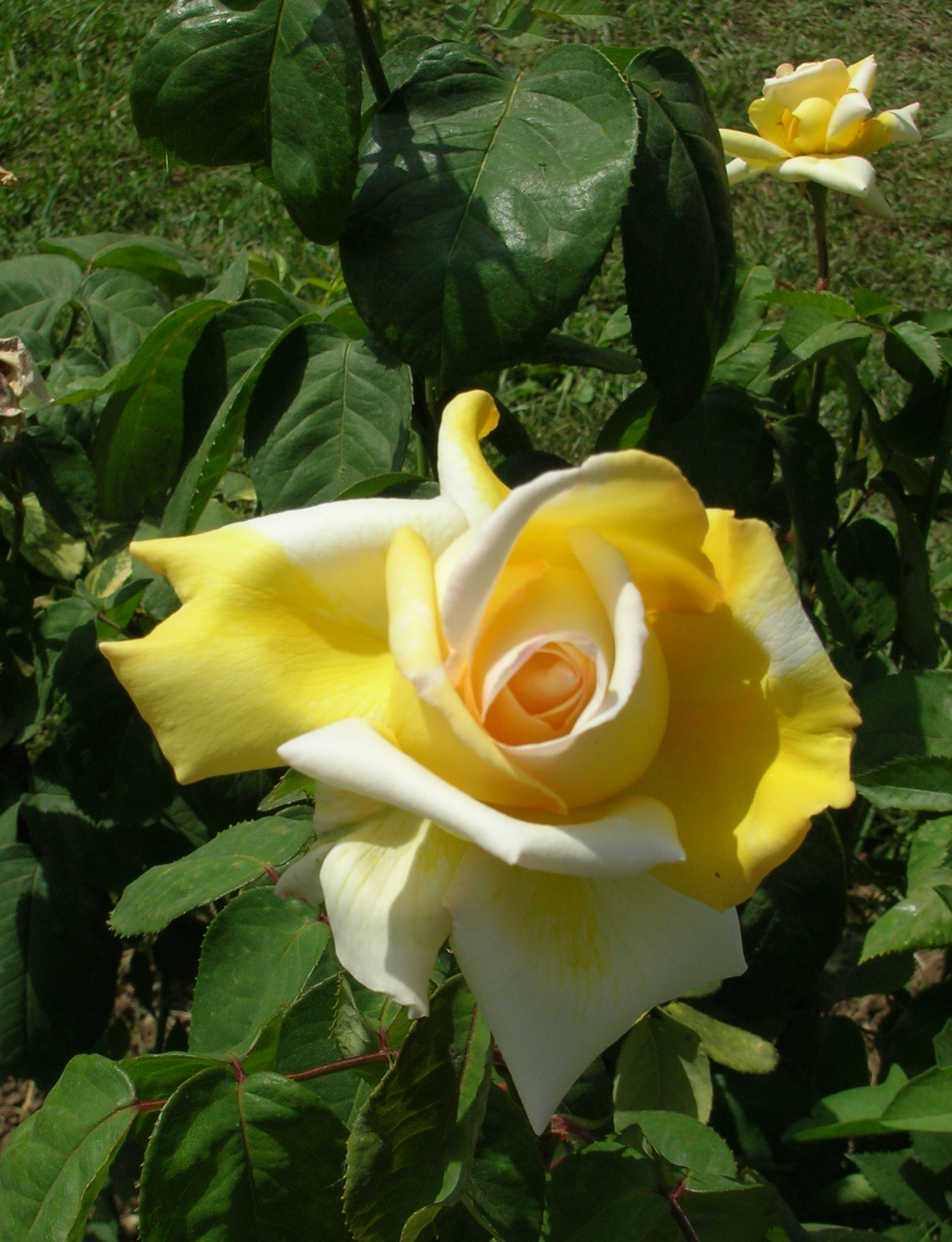
'Folle courtisane' a cream rose cultivar developed by 'Delbar' in 1988.

== Apple breeding ==
Delbard was first in France to create a breeding program for disease resistant apple cultivars, located near Commentry, France, it is called "Delbard Pepinieres International".

This is done internationally by screening selections and mutations of seedlings and variations of the domesticated apple, some of which have adapted to resist certain apple diseases. Another approach is to find the resistant genes in certain species of crab apple which is the ancestor of the domesticated apple, and to introduce those desired traits through backcrossing.

Altogether, the apples still needs to taste good as well, so this involves years of experiments, tasting and testing to provide a good apple for the consumer, which should be disease resistant and of good flavour, texture and looks.

Jean-Paul Reynoird, Delbard's research director says, that only about twenty selections out of 2000 hybrids initiated, will make it till the end. Delbard has a separate program for pear breeding, aiming to combat fireblight.

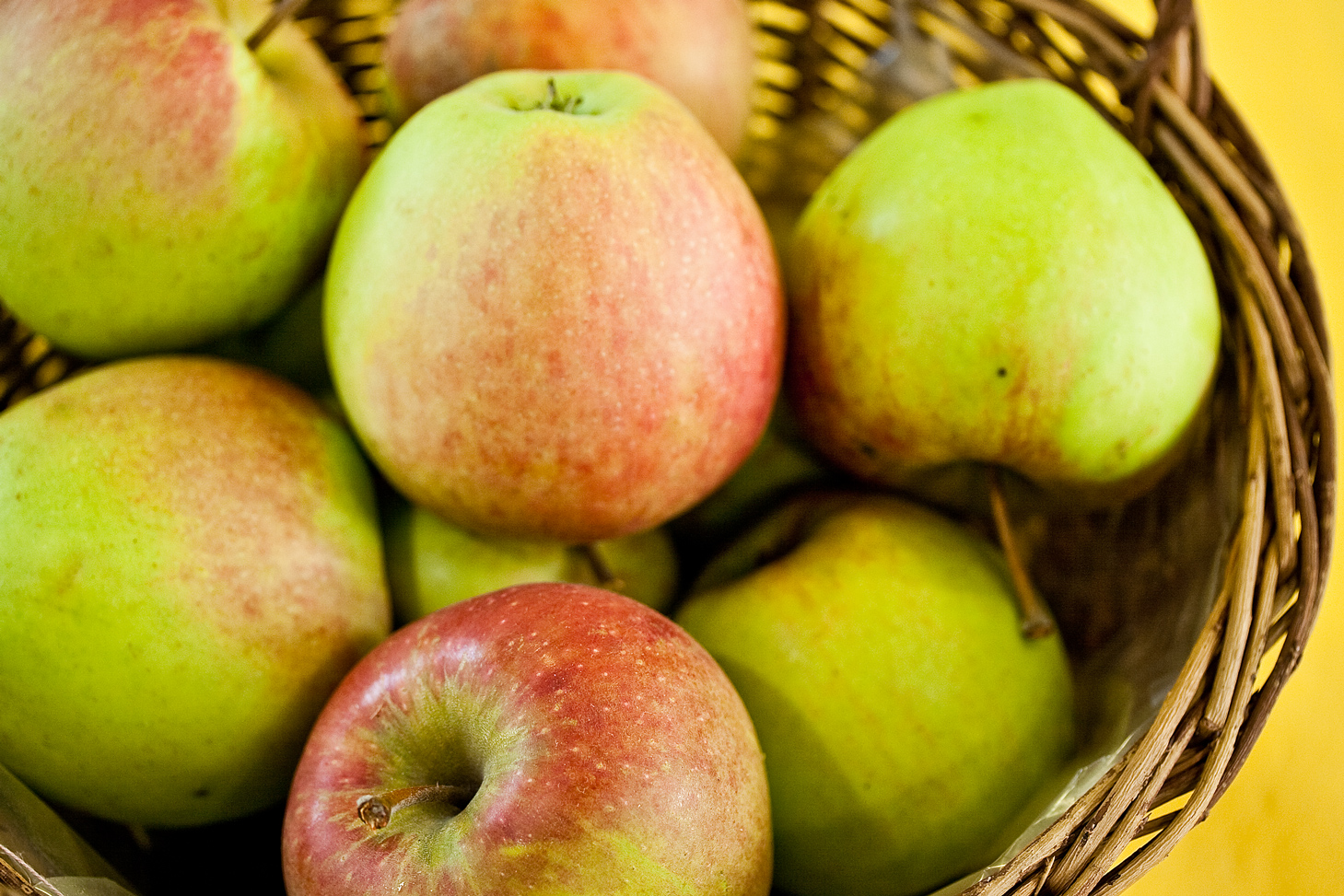
Delbard Jubilee is an apple cultivar developed by Delbard.

One of the apple cultivars developed by Delbard is the Tentation apple, also called Dellblush, which is limited for cultivation to New Zealand, Delbard Jubilee, and Delbarestivale.

== Tissue culture ==
Tissue culture started at Delbard in the early 1980s when they began to use fragments of stems and green tissue of certified virus-free mother stock to grow plant material in vitro. The clonal modern approach, is still under the classification of vegetative propagation, hence reproducing true to type. This is used for fruits as well as for flower and roses. In the fruit tree department which itself is producing 300,000 trees annually, two thirds are sold at the retail garden centers directly to the private customers, usually in bonsai containers or pots, and one third is sold for commercial growers. Plants sold for private user needs, which are carefully raised to perfection and already ready to fruit, are usually marked with a "W".

== Regenesis ==
Delbard is utilizing to barn new technology called "regenesis" which involves the use of irradiation to force mutations from tissue culture material in vitro. Then they regenerate a bud from the irradiated cells. This is done with hope to change only a few undesirable characteristics of a plant and preserve its overall combination of traits.

As of today this business is producing nursery stock material for commercial growers, as well as for forty retail garden centers. The nursery area covers six hundred hectares, or about 1500 acres, of sheltered greenhouses and open field plantations.
