= Newtown Pippin =

Apple cultivar

'Newtown Pippin'
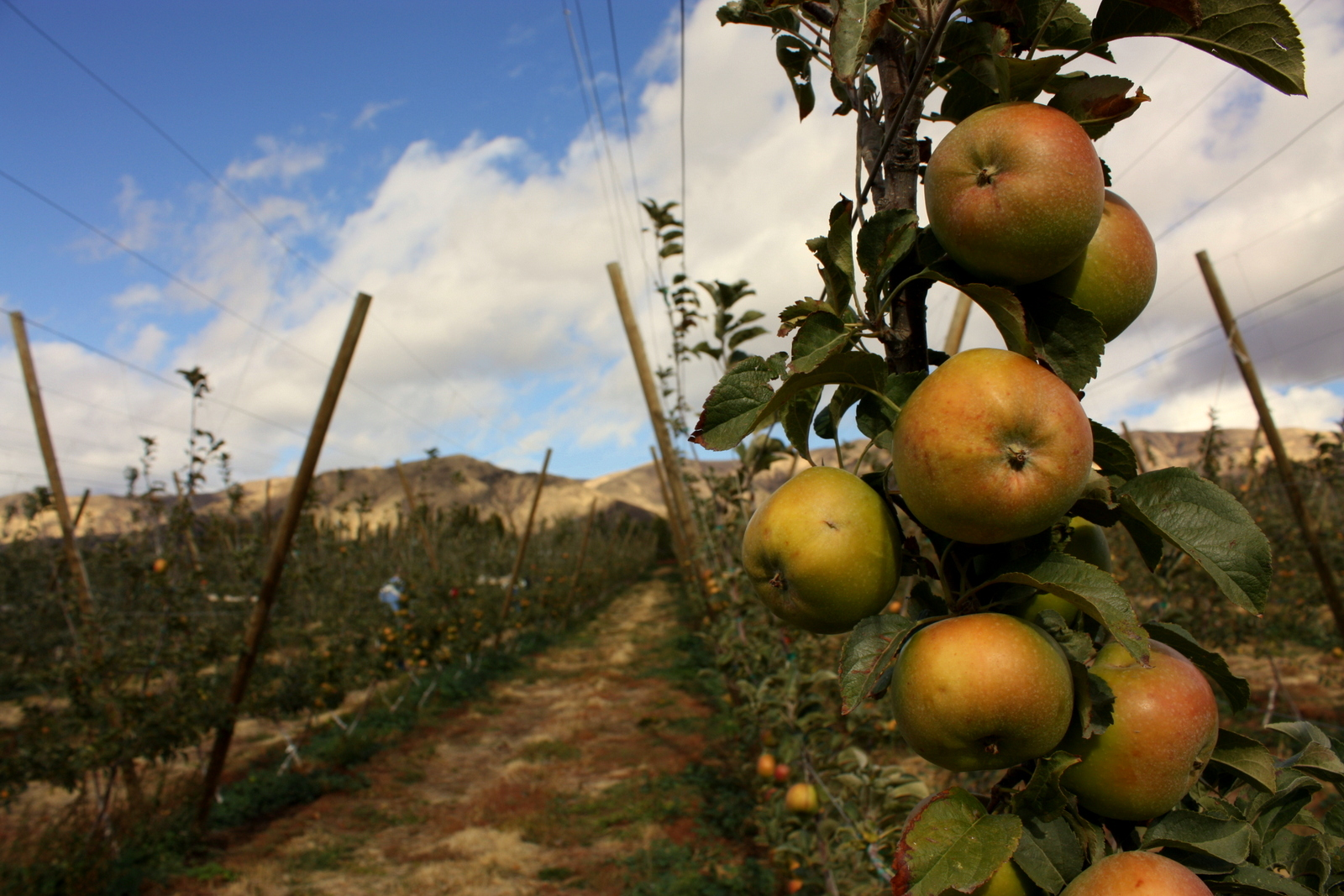
- Genus: Malus
- Species: Malus domestica
- Hybrid parentage: unknown
- Cultivar: 'Newtown Pippin'
- Origin: Newtown, New York

The Newtown Pippin, also known as Albemarle Pippin, is an American apple that originated in the late 17th or early 18th century and is still cultivated on a small scale. At one time, there were two very similar apple cultivars known as the 'Yellow Newtown' ('Albermarle Pippin') and 'Green Newtown' ('Brooke Pippin'), one of which perhaps originated as a sport of the other.

== Characteristics ==
The Newtown Pippin is typically light green, sometimes with a yellow tinge. It is often russeted around the stem. The flesh is yellow and crisp. The flavor is complex and somewhat tart, and requires storage to develop properly; some sources ascribe to it a piney aroma. Green and yellow varieties are sometimes distinguished but it is not clear that they are in fact distinct cultivars. It is one of the best keeping apples.

== Benjamin Franklin ==
The Newtown Pippin is recorded as one of the favorite apples of Benjamin Franklin. In 1759, two barrels were sent to Franklin in London.

== Development and cultivation ==
Virginia-grown Albemarle (Newtown) pippins, an heirloom variety that originated on western Long Island, NY, in the in the late 17th or early 18th century.

This variety originated as a chance seedling (a "pippin") on the Gershom Moore estate in the village of Newtown (now called Elmhurst; the Moore property stood in the vicinity of what is now Broadway and 45th Avenue) in Queens, New York in the late 17th or early 18th century.

It was widely grown and praised in colonial America. Thomas Jefferson, for example, wrote from Paris that "they have no apples here to compare with our Newtown Pippin."

It was widely cultivated in the Piedmont region, brought there by Dr. Thomas Walker, who grew it on his estate, Castle Hill. U.S. presidents George Washington and Thomas Jefferson both grew the Newtown in Virginia, where it acquired the alternate name "Albemarle Pippin" after Albemarle County, Virginia. It came to the fore in 1838 when Andrew Stevenson, the American minister to Great Britain, presented Queen Victoria with a gift basket of the apples from his wife's Albemarle County orchard. In response, the British Parliament lifted import duties on the variety, and it was an important export until duties were reimposed during World War II.

A partnership between the New York City Department of Parks and Recreation, New York Restoration Project, Slow Food NYC, and Green Apple Cleaners is providing hundreds of Newtown Pippin saplings (and pollenizer saplings) to community gardens, schools, parks and other public spaces throughout the city.

== Uses ==
Originally grown as a dessert apple, it is now grown primarily for cider.

In modern times, the Newtown Pippin has been eclipsed by the Granny Smith apple, which is more handsome and not as susceptible to russetting. It is still grown commercially in New York, where most of the harvest is used in Martinelli's sparkling ciders. The Newtown Pippin is still available in Virginia, New York, California, the Pacific Northwest, and a few other places in the East, including roadside stands and at farmer's markets. It continues to attract attention as an heirloom variety, and was identified as one of the parents of the Ginger Gold variety. As of 2014 it has attracted attention for its potential to be used in hard ciders, and at least one single varietal is sold in its native New York.

== Bibliography ==
- Thomas, John J. (1849). The American Fruit Culturist. Auburn: Derby, Miller and Company. pp. 182–183. ISBN 1-4290-1330-3.
