= Delbarestivale =

Apple cultivar

'Delcorf'
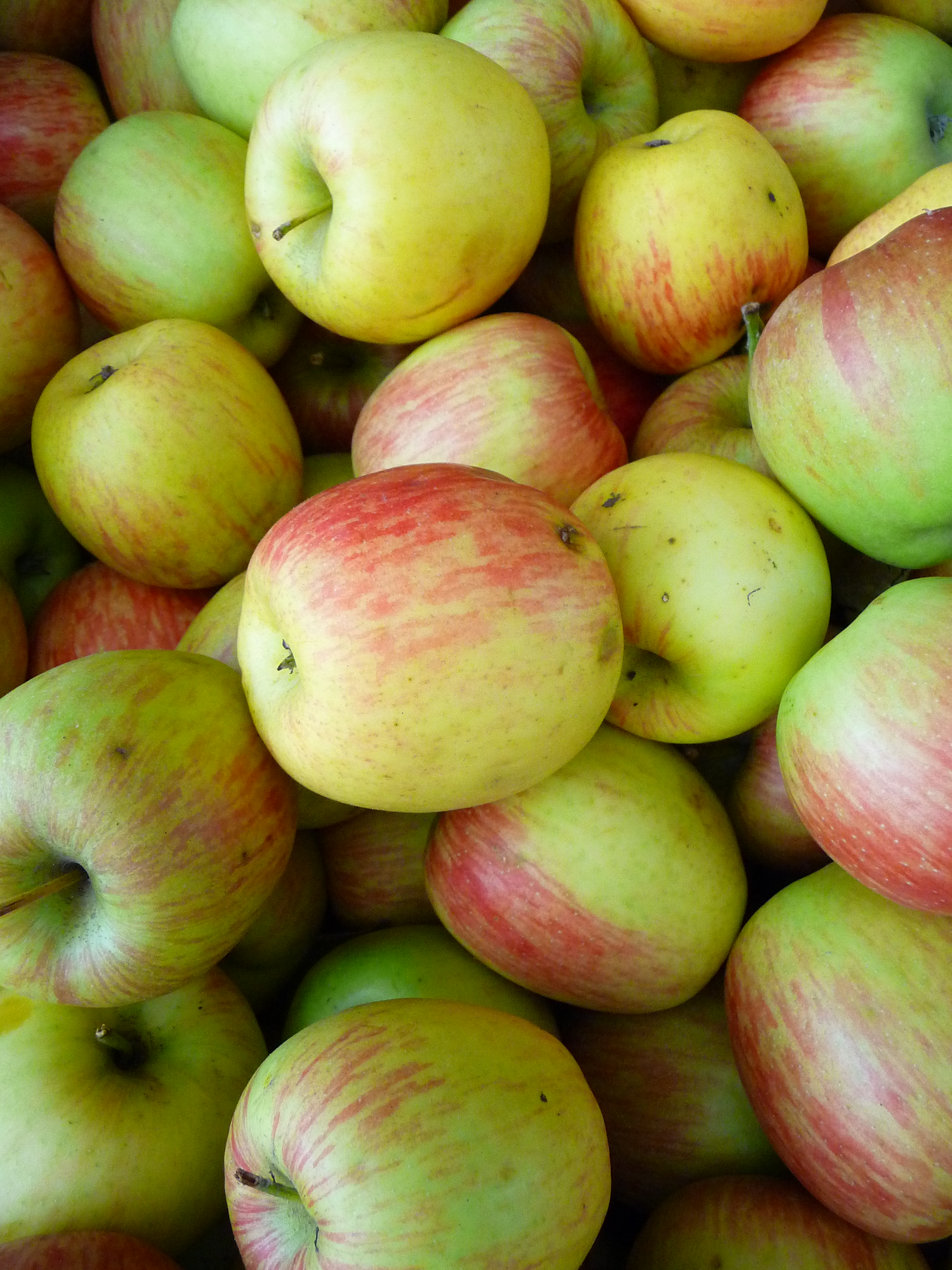
- Genus: Malus
- Species: Malus domestica
- Hybrid parentage: 'Golden Delicious' × 'Starks Jonagrimes'
- Cultivar: 'Delbarestivale' or 'Delcorf'
- Origin: France

'Delbarestivale', also called 'Delbard Estivale' and 'Delcorf', is a cultivar of domesticated apple, which was developed by the Delbard nursery in France. It is a very sweet apple. 'Delcorf' is a parent of the 'Zari' apple and the 'Nicogreen' apple.

It was awarded the Award of Garden Merit by the Royal Horticultural Society in 1998.
