= Grimes Golden =

Apple cultivar

Malus domestica 'Grimes Golden'
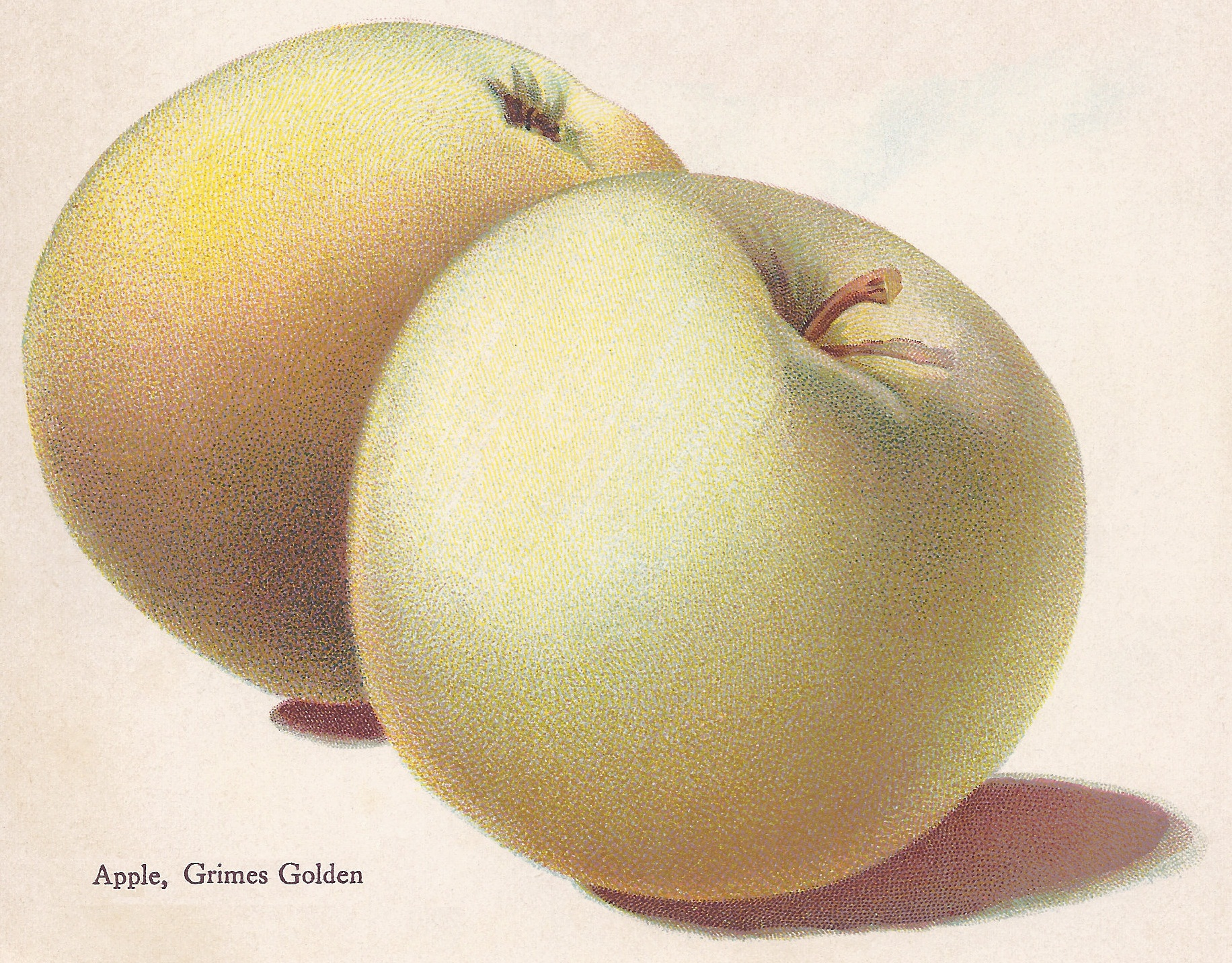
- Hybrid parentage: 'unknown'
- Cultivar: 'Grimes Golden'
- Origin: Wellsburg, Virginia, United States, 1832

Grimes Golden is a cultivar of apple that originated in Wellsburg, Virginia (now West Virginia) in 1832 on the farm of Thomas Grimes. Flesh yellow, firm, fine-grained, juicy, aromatic, spicy, subacid. Susceptible to bitter pit. It could be a parent of the famous Golden Delicious apple, and is known to be the maternal parent of 'Yellospur', and the pollen parent of 'Sinta'.

Grimes Golden
---	When to pick	When ripe enough to eat	Latest cold storage limit
In Northern states	Sept. 8 - Oct. 28	Nov. 1-10	Jan. 15
In Southern states	Aug. 23 - Sept. 18	Oct. 5-15	Dec. 15
