= Jonagold =

Apple cultivar

Malus domestica
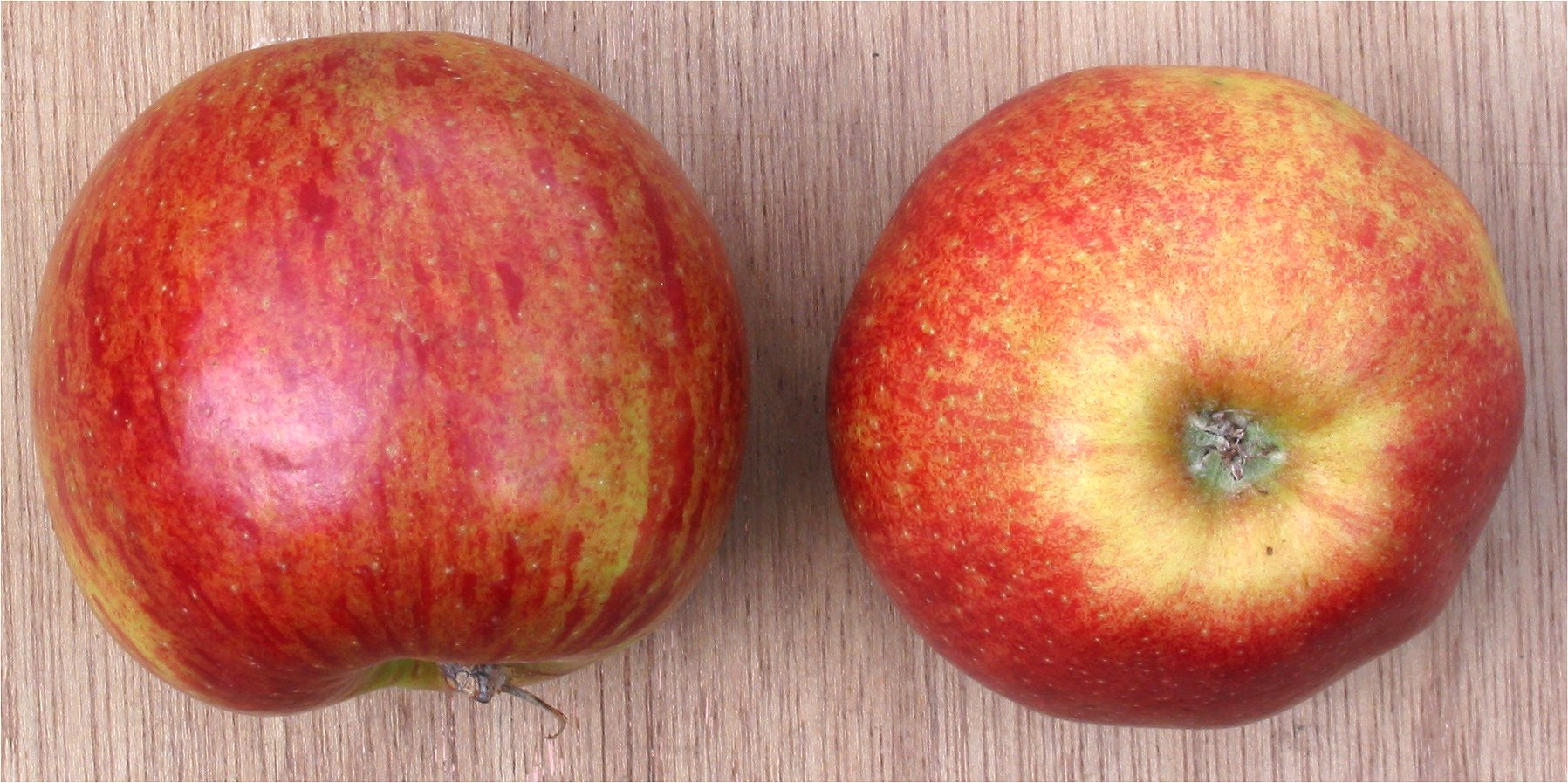
- Species: Malus domestica
- Hybrid parentage: Golden Delicious × Jonathan
- Cultivar: N.Y. 43013-1
- Marketing names: Jonagold
- Origin: (United States) Geneva, New York, 1943

Jonagold /ˈdʒɒnəˌɡoʊld/ is a cultivated variety or cultivar of apple originally from New York, United States, but known internationally. Outside of the United States, it is popular in Belgium and the Netherlands.

== Origins ==
The Jonagold is a cross between the crisp Golden Delicious and the blush-crimson Jonathan; the name Jonagold is a portmanteau of these two variety names. It was developed in 1943 in New York State Agricultural Experiment Station of Cornell University's College of Agriculture and Life Sciences, selected as N.Y. 43013-1 in 1953, officially released in 1968 by Roger Way.

== Description ==
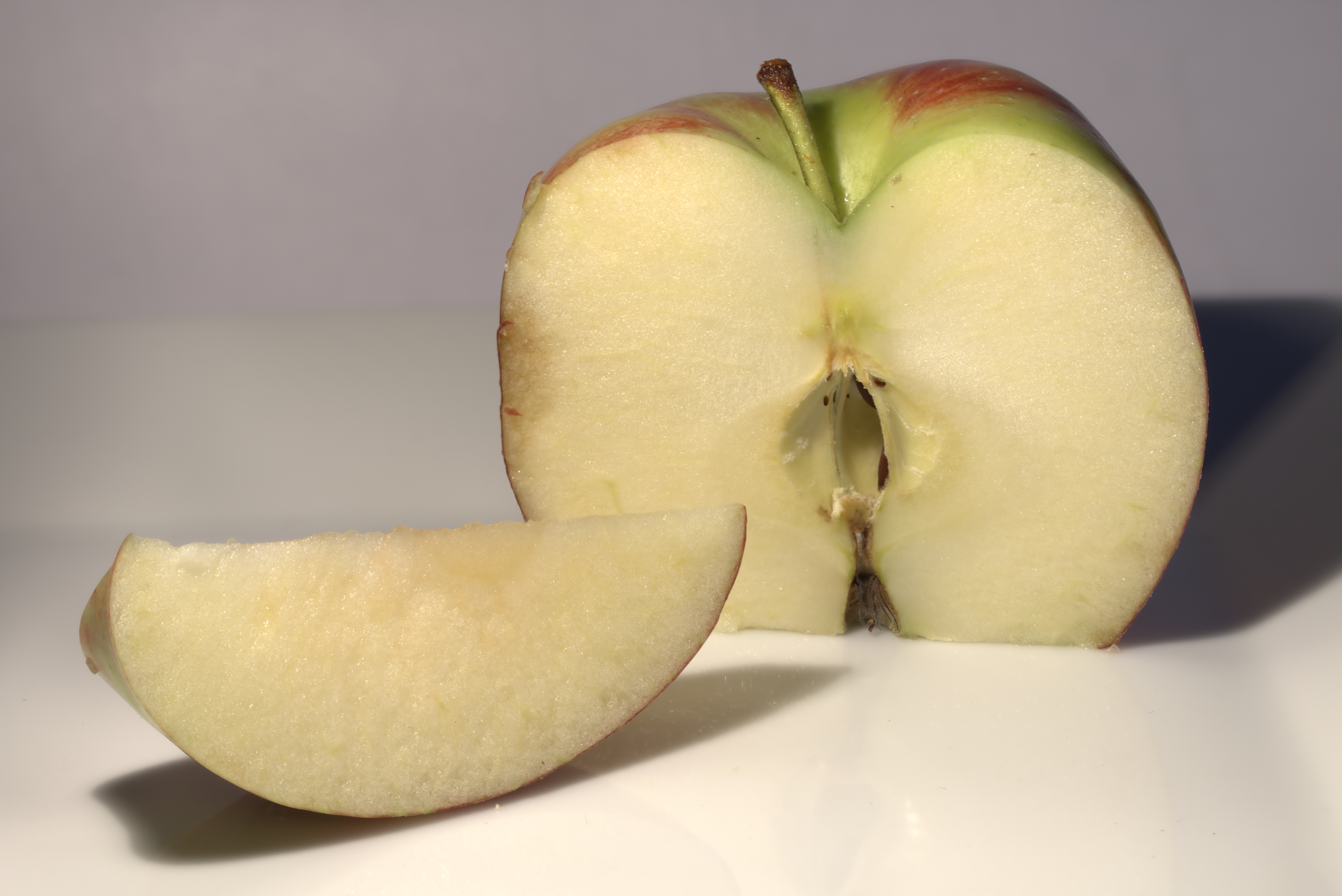
Sliced Jonagold

The Jonagold apple is a large sweet fruit with a thin skin that is green-yellow with streaks of crimson. The flesh is creamy yellowish and has a breaking texture. Because of their large size they are now favored by commercial growers in many parts of the world, and the apples can last up to two months in refrigerated storage and up to ten months in controlled atmosphere storage.

Jonagold is triploid, with sterile pollen, and as such, requires a second type of apple for pollen and is incapable of pollenizing other cultivars. It is susceptible to the diseases apple scab, powdery mildew, and fire blight, as well as the physiological disorders bitter pit and sunburn.

In 1988, the cultivar was awarded the American Society for Horticultural Science Outstanding Fruit Cultivar Award. As of 2020, it was the most widely produced apple in Belgium, where it is used in Stella Cidre, and is credited with saving the European fruit industry. As of 2008, it was one of the fifteen most popular apple cultivars in the United States according to the US Apple Association. The European Fruit Magazine cites it as the second most popular apple in the Netherlands, behind the Elstar.

Typical size distribution
60-65 mm	65-70 mm	70-75 mm	75-80 mm	80-85 mm	85-90 mm	90-95 mm
5 %	10 %	20 %	34 %	25 %	5 %	1 %

The Jonagored Apple, a sport mutation of Jonagold discovered in Belgium in 1985, was once covered under United States Patent PP05937, now expired.

== Descendant cultivars ==
- Shinano Sweet (Fuji × Jonagold)
- Excel Jonagold
- Jonagored
