= Golden Reinette =

Apple cultivar

'Golden Reinette'
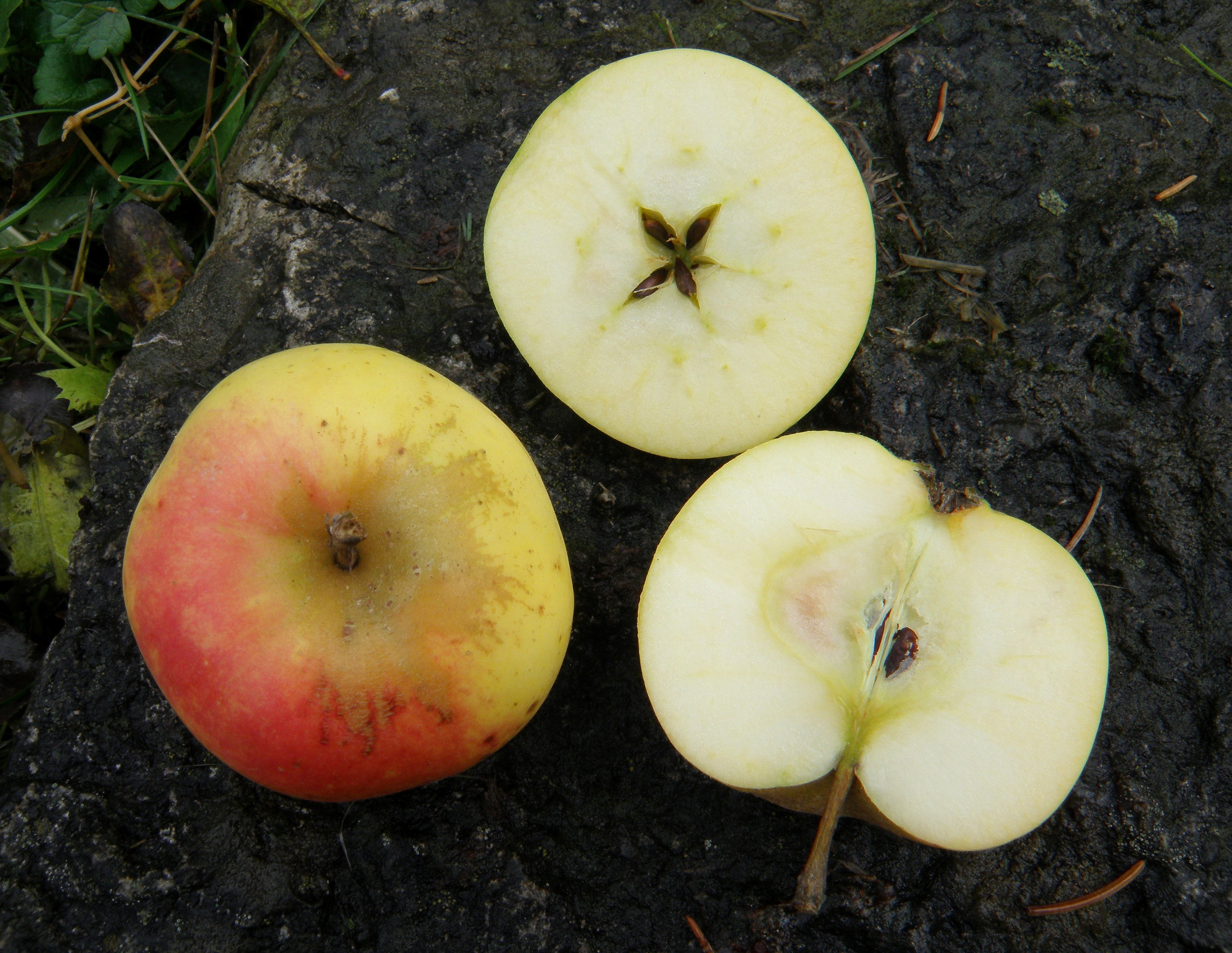
- Cultivar: 'Golden Reinette'

The 'Golden Reinette' is a cultivar of domesticated apple that is also known as the 'English Pippin', Kirke's Golden Reinette. and Reinette de Hollande 'Golden Reinette' is a parent to 'Blenheim Orange', 'Daniel Fele Renet', 'Harberts Reinette', 'Orleans Reinette', 'Reinett Descardre', 'Beauty of Hants' and 'Kaiser Wilhelm'.
