= Wyken Pippin =

Apple cultivar

Wyken Pippin is an old cultivar of domesticated apple originating in the Netherlands, or have originated in the garden of the Wyken Manor house in England from a seedling that was sourcing back to the Netherlands or Belgium, possibly in the early 1700s. It has several other names including 'Alford Prize' and 'Pheasant's Eye'.

It is a small greenish-yellow fruit with lenticels, flattened shape and intense and delicious flavor. Flesh texture is dense. Uses are mainly for fresh eating. It has a lower content of vitamin C relative to other apple cultivars. It was one of the top cultivars to be used for home gardening in the 19th century. It is an ancestor of Laxton's Superb.
