= Pippin apple =

Pippin apple may refer to:

- Allington Pippin
- Cox's Orange Pippin
- King of the Pippins
- Newtown Pippin
- Ribston Pippin
- Sturmer Pippin

== See also ==
- List of apple cultivars
- Apple Pippin, a multimedia technology platform
