= Russet apple =

Varieties of apple with yellowish-brown skins

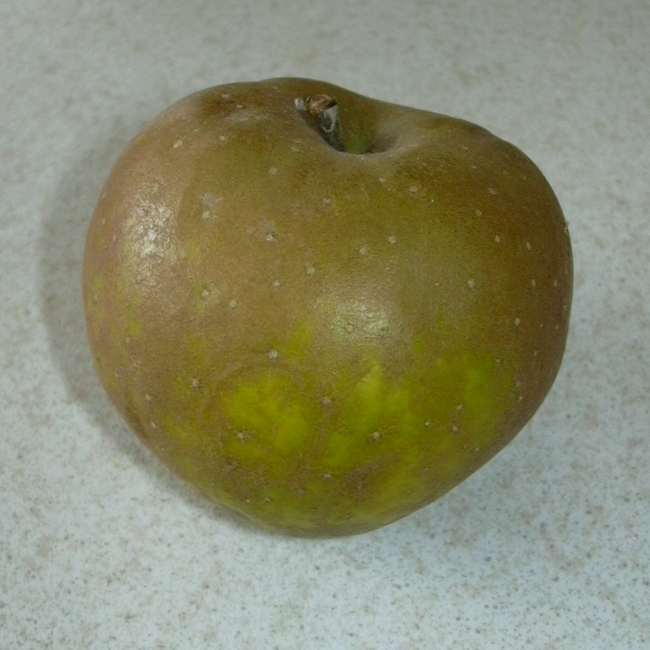
An Egremont Russet apple, almost completely covered in russeting

Russet apples are varieties and cultivars of apples that regularly exhibit russeting, partial or complete coverage with rough patches of greenish-brown to yellowish-brown colour. While russeting is generally an undesirable trait in modern cultivars, russet varieties are often seen as more traditional, and associated with aromatic flavours.

== Overview ==
Many apple cultivars have some natural russeting, but some are almost entirely covered in it, notably the Egremont Russet. Russet apples often exhibit a scent and flavour reminiscent of nuts, and are often very sweet. Despite this, modern apple breeders rarely accept russeting in new apple cultivars. The amount of russeting can be affected by various factors including, weather, disease or pest damage and agrochemical applications (e.g. insecticides, fungicides and growth regulators).

Russet apples also go under the name "rusticoat", "russeting" and "leathercoat". The name "leathercoat" was known in Shakespeare's time; for instance, in Henry IV, part 2, Davy says to Bardolph, "there's a dish of leathercoats for you".

== Types ==
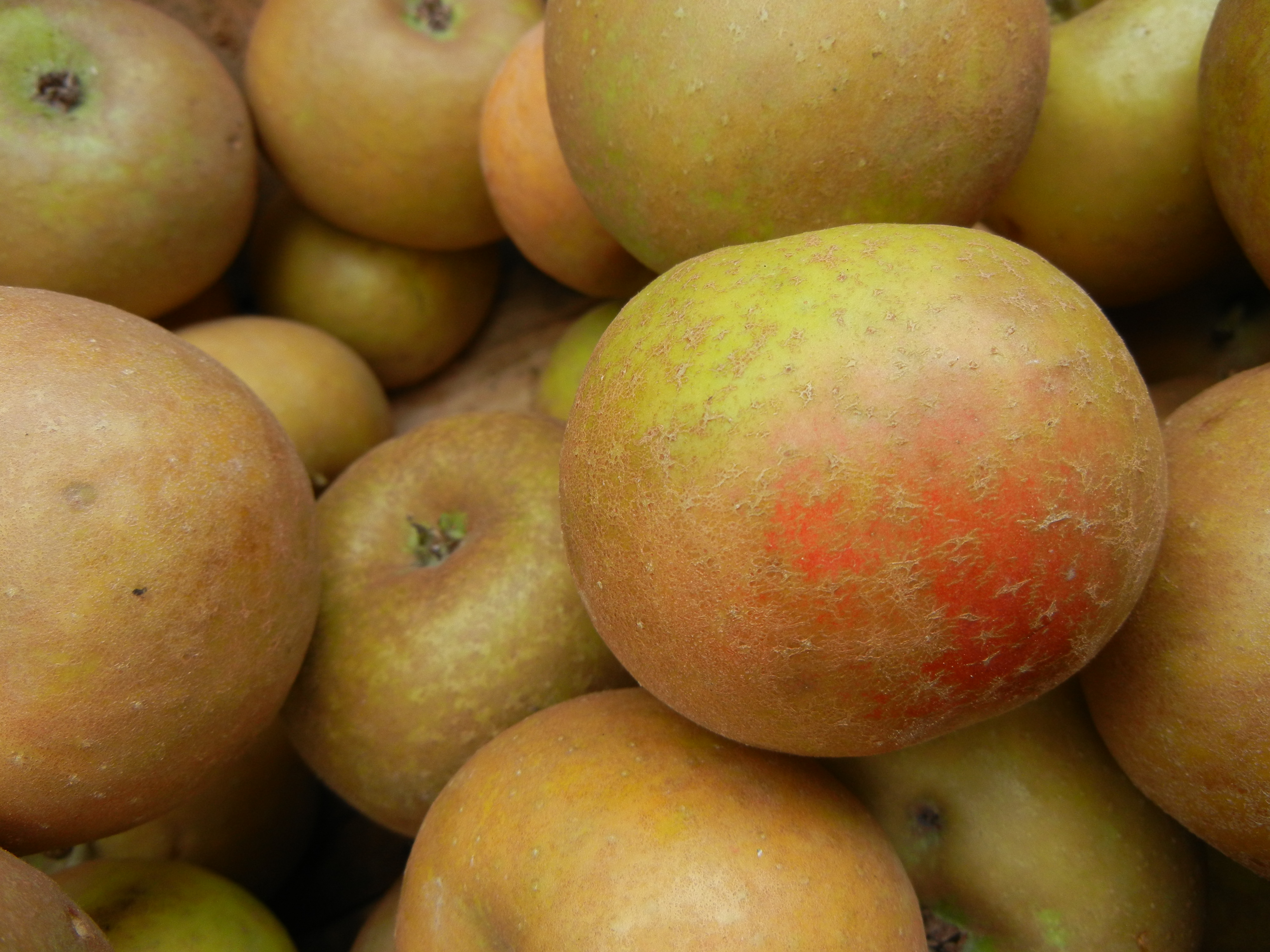
'Ashmead's Kernel'

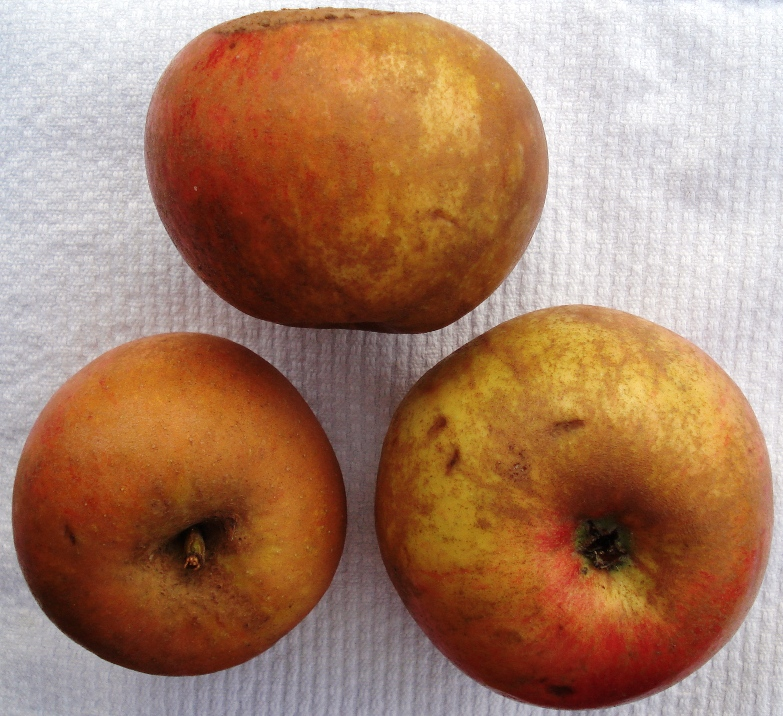
Reinette Grise

- 'Acklam Russet'
- 'Adam's Pearmain'
- 'Ashmead's Kernel'
- 'Blenheim Orange'
- 'Belle de Boskoop'
- 'Braddick's Nonpareil'
- 'Claygate Pearmain'
- Duke of Devonshire
- 'Egremont Russet'
- 'English Russet'
- 'Golden Russet'
- 'Hereford Russet'
- 'Knobby Russet'
- 'Merton Russet'
- 'Nonpareil'
- Pitmaston Pineapple
- 'Reinette du Canada'
- Reinette Grise
- 'Ribston Pippin'
- 'Ross Nonpareil'
- 'Roxbury Russet' (also known as Boston Russet)
- 'Rudford Russet'
- 'St Edmund's Pippin'
- 'Sam Young'
- 'Tydeman's Late Orange'
- 'Winston'

== See also ==
- Pyrus pyrifolia (also known as Japanese pear)
