= Golden Russet =

Apple cultivar

'Golden Russet' apple
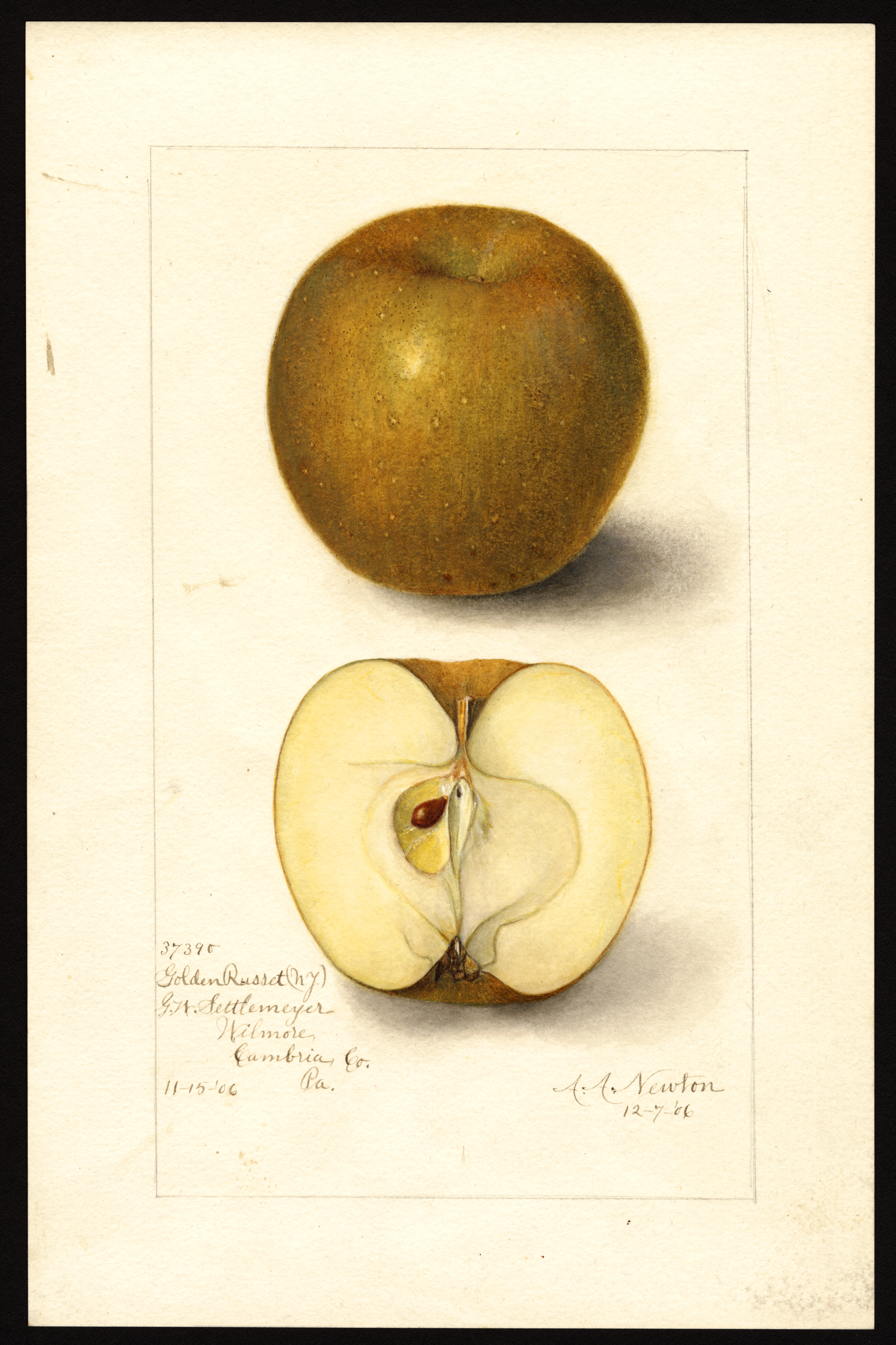
- Genus: Malus
- Species: Malus domestica
- Hybrid parentage: Chance seedling
- Cultivar: 'Golden Russet'
- Origin: USA, 1800–1849

Golden Russet is an old American cultivar of domesticated apple which is marketed as excellent for fresh eating as well as for apple cider production. It is a russet apple and is therefore especially used as a cider apple. It is sometimes known as 'English Golden Russet', and has frequently been confused with 'English Russet'.

The fruits of this cultivar are yellow gold with an occasional orange flush and lot of russeting. Its flesh is fine in texture, juicy and crisp. Early in the season, Golden Russets exhibit an attractive, though extreme, tartness that makes them an excellent eating apple; if left to ripen long, their flavor grows quite sweet, but their flesh deteriorates and becomes mealy and soft. Despite its positive characteristics, the apple does not market well as an eating variety because of its russet. Harvested at late season, the Golden Russet keeps very well in storage. It keeps its shape in cooking, though its texture—regardless of when it was harvested—will turn noticeably mealy when baked. The Golden Russet's tree can tolerate some degree of cold temperature.

It was discovered in New York State between the years 1800 and 1849 from a seedling of an English russet apple cultivar. Fruit heritage organisation Orange Pippin suggest the flavour and apple shape indicate the parent may have been Ashmead's Kernel.

== See also ==
- 'Reinette du Canada'
- 'Roxbury Russet'
