= Reinette =

Name of several apple cultivars

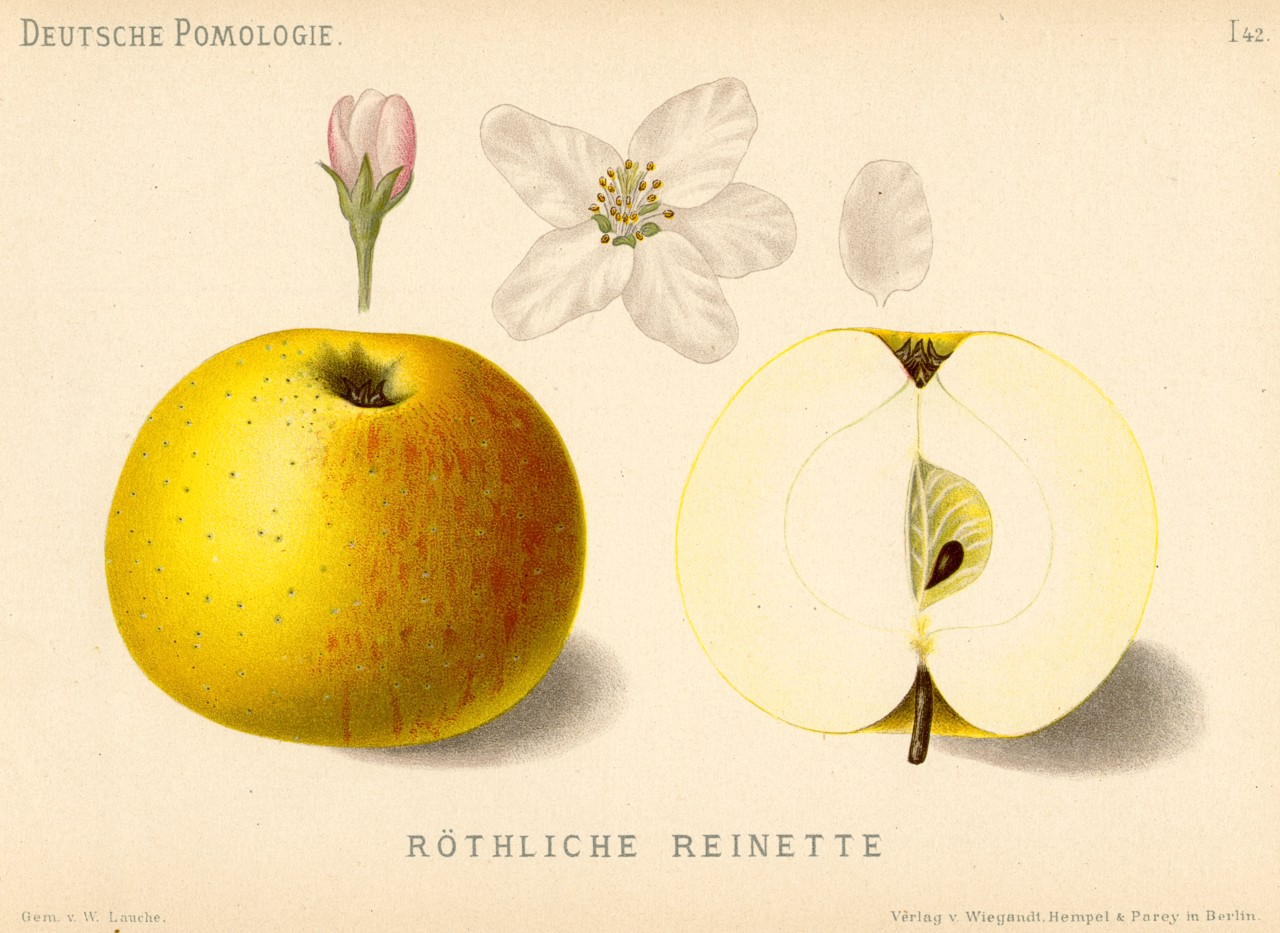
The Reine des reinettes apple

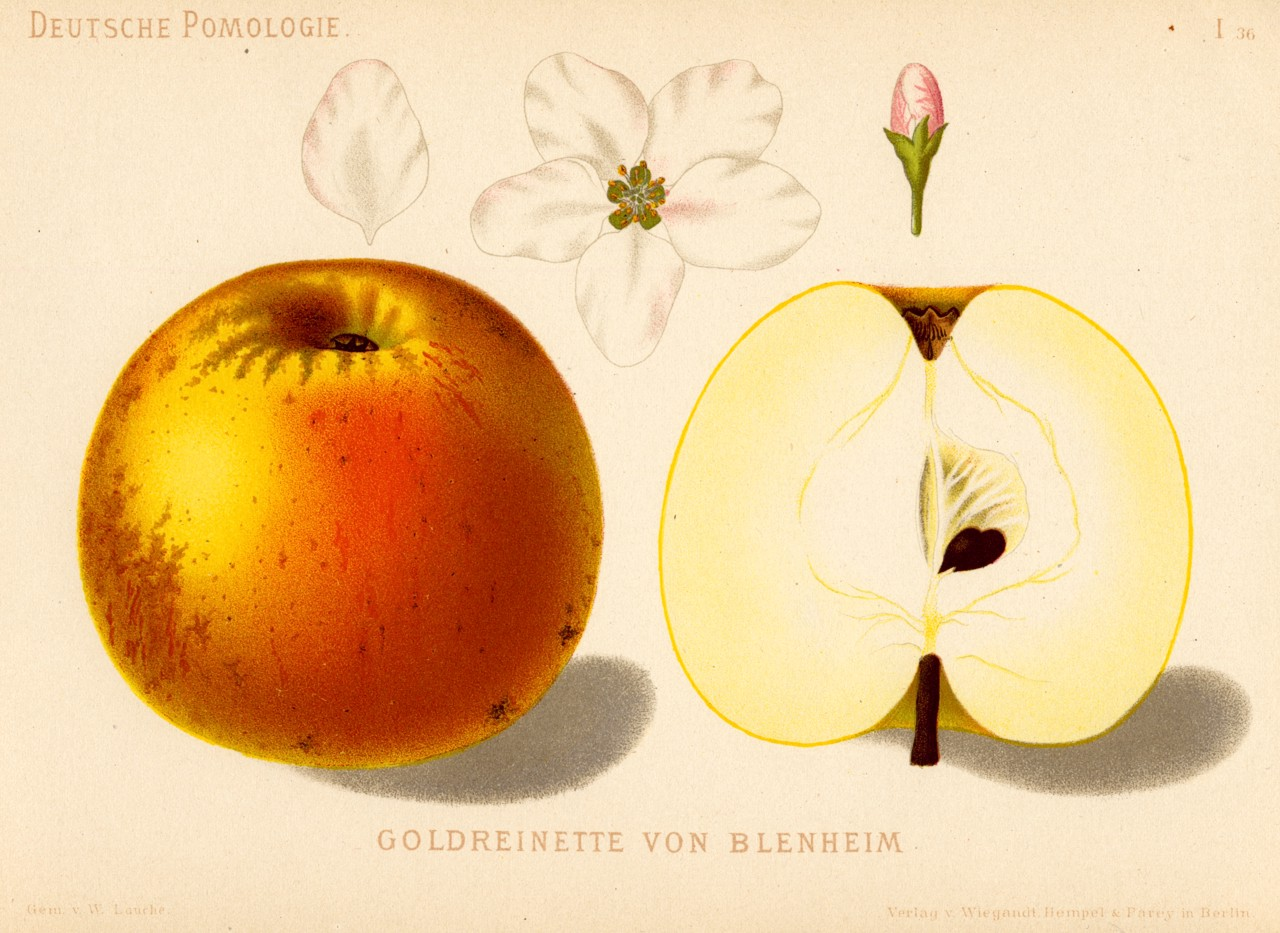

Reinette (French for "little queen"), often Rennet in English and popular in Italian and Portuguese cuisines as Renetta and Reineta, respectively, is the name of a number of apple cultivars, in the Diel-Lucas and Diel-Dochnahl apple classification systems. Reinettes are divided into the following groups:

- 1. One-Colored Reinettes, eg., Ananas Reinette, Reinette Franche, Rhode-Island Greening
- 2. Red Reinettes, eg., Baumans Reinette, Jonathan
- 3a. Gold Reinettes striped, eg., Blenheim Orange, Cox Orange Pippin, von Zuccalmaglios Reinette
- 3b. Gold Reinettes blushed, eg., Court of Wick
- 4. Gray Reinettes, eg., Brownless Russet, Roxbury Russet

== Cultivars ==
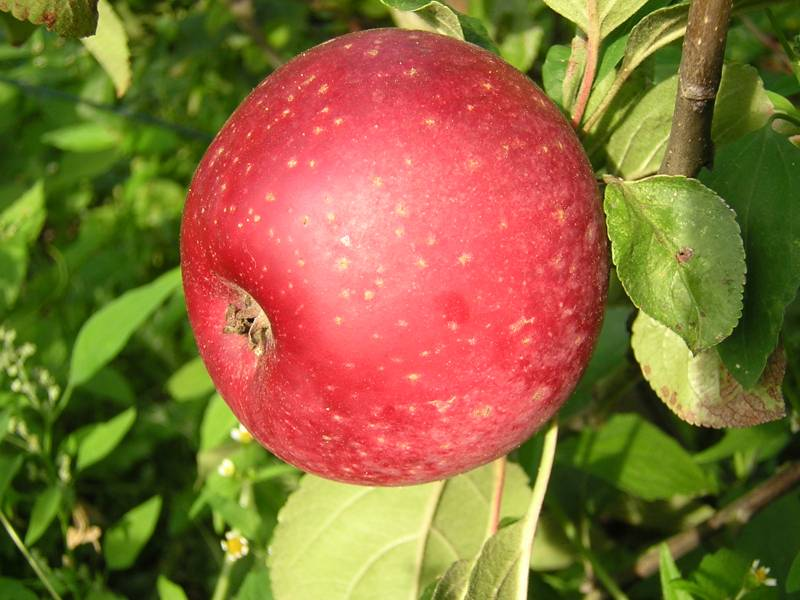
Reinette etoilée

- Adams Pearmain diploid S-genotype S1 S3
- Allington Pippin diploid S-genotype S1 S5
- Biesterfelder Renette triploid
- Blenheim Orange triploid S-genotype S1 S3 S10
- Brownless Russet
- Bödiker's Gold Reinette
- Court of Wick
- Daniel Fele Renet triploid
- Golden Reinette = Reinette de Hollande diploid S-genotype S1 S3
- Harberts Reinette triploid
- Jonathan diploid
- Kaiser Wilhelm triploid
- Karminj de Sonnaville triploid S-genotype S5 S7 S9
- Laxton's Superb diploid
- Laxton's Royalty diploid
- Merton Pearmain
- Merton Russet diploid S-genotype S5 S24
- Oranje de Sonnaville triploid
- Peasgood's Nonsuch
- Reine des reinettes
- Reine des Reinettes Rouge, diploid
- Reinette à Longue Queue, diploid
- Reinette Ananas diploid
- Reinette Baumann diploid
- Reinette Bergamotte, an apple-pear graft-chimaera
- Reinette Clochard
- Reinette Coulon triploid
- Reinette Courthay
- Reinette d'Amérique
- Reinette d'Armorique
- Beauty of Hants triploid
- Reinette de Bretagne
- Reinette de Brive
- Reinette de Champagne diploid S-genotype S2 S4
- Reinette de Chênée,
- Cox's Orange Pippin diploid S-genotype S5 S9
- Reinette de Flandre
- Reinette de France triploid S-genotype S3 S19 S24
- Reinette de Hollande see Golden Reinette
- Reinette de l'Hopital,
- Reinette de Landsberg = Landsberger Reinette
- Reinette de Savoie
- Reinette de Servin
- Reinette de Tournai
- Reinette Descardre triploid
- Reinette des Carmes = Carmeliter Reinette diploid
- Reinette dorée
- Reinette d'Orléans triploid S-genotype S1 S3 S40
- Reinette du Canada triploid S-genotype S1 S2 S3
- Reinette du Mans
- Reinette du Portugal see Reinette Grise de Portugal
- Reinette Duquesne
- Reinette étoilée
- Reinette franche diploid
- Reinette grise de Lorient
- Reinette Grise de Portugal
- Reinette Hernaut
- Reinette jaune sucrée
- Reinette Limon = Limonen Reinette
- Reinette Newtown or Reinette Albemarle
- Reinette Oldenburg
- Ribston Pippin triploid
- Reinette Sanguine du Rhin
- Rhode-Island Greening.
- Roxbury Russet
- Rötliche Reinette
- Sturmer Pippin
- Suntan triploid
- von Zuccalmaglios Reinette
