= Ashmead =

Ashmead may refer to:

People

- Ann Wheeler Harnwell Ashmead (born 1929), American archaeologist
- Ashmead Nedd (born 2001), West Indian cricketer
- Charles Ashmead Schaeffer (1843–1898), seventh President of the University of Iowa
- Elizabeth Fry Ashmead Schaeffer (1812–1892), leader of many ministries of the Lutheran Church in Philadelphia
- Ellis Ashmead-Bartlett (1881–1931), British war correspondent during the First World War
- Ellis Ashmead-Bartlett (politician) (1849–1902), American born British Conservative politician
- Henry Graham Ashmead (1838–1920), American historian from Pennsylvania
- Isaac Ashmead (1790–1870), printer in Philadelphia, Pennsylvania
- John Ashmead (1917–1992), American novelist
- Larry Ashmead (1932–2010), American book editor
- William Ashmead Courtenay (1831–1908), mayor of Charleston, South Carolina
- William Harris Ashmead (1855–1908), American entomologist
- William Burdett-Coutts (1851–1921), British Conservative politician (born William Lehman Ashmead-Bartlett)

Other uses

- Ashmead College, former name of a system of for-profit colleges located in the Pacific Northwest region of the United States
- Ashmead Combined School on Walton Court housing estate in Aylesbury, Buckinghamshire, UK
- Ashmead School, a former secondary school in Reading, Berkshire, UK
- Ashmead Village, Pennsylvania, an unincorporated community in Pennsylvania, United States
- Ashmead's Kernel, a triploid cultivar of apple
- DeArmond, Ashmead & Bickley, an early-20th-century architecture and landscape architecture firm based in Philadelphia, Pennsylvania
- George A. Ferris and Son (redirect from George Ashmead Ferris), was an architectural firm in Reno, Nevada
