= Nonpareil =

Nonpareil(s) from the French meaning 'without equal', it may also refer to:

- Nonpareil, Guyana, a village in Guyana
- Nonpareil, Nebraska, a community in the United States
- Nonpareil, Oregon, a former community in the United States
- Nonpareils, a confection of small sweet spheres used to decorate cakes, sweets, and pastries
- Jack "Nonpareil" Dempsey (1862–1895), Irish boxer
- HMS Nonpareil, several ships
- Nonpareil, a rag composed by Scott Joplin published in 1907
- Nonpareil, an Al Cohn jazz recording from 1981
- Nonpareil, a variety of almond
- Nonpareil, a caper (caper bud) of a smaller size
- Nonpareil (apple), an apple cultivar
- nonpareil (typography), the type size between minion and agate
- Painted bunting, a type of bird also known as nonpareil
- The Nonpareil Club, a fictional club mentioned in The Hound of the Baskervilles
- The Daily Nonpareil, a newspaper in Iowa, United States
- Nonpareil, a multi-platform emulator for some models of Hewlett-Packard scientific calculators

Small particles:

- Sprinkles, a slightly different decorative candy

== See also ==
- Sans Pareil (disambiguation)
