= Lady Alice (apple) =

Apple cultivar

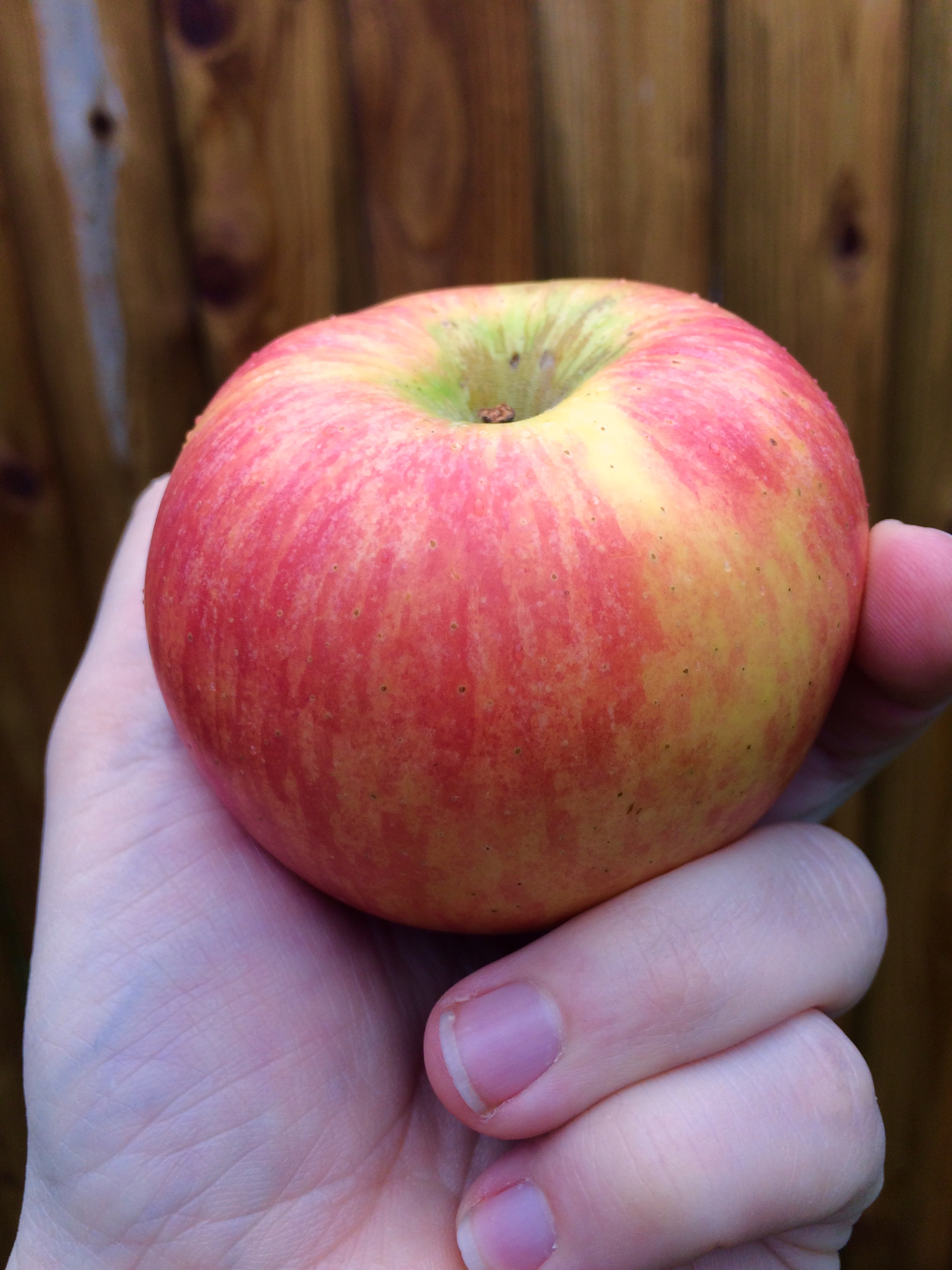
- Genus: Malus
- Species: M. domestica
- Hybrid parentage: Chance seedling
- Origin: United States, near Gleed, Washington, 1979

Lady Alice is a cultivar of domesticated apple that was discovered in 1979 at an orchard near Gleed, Washington, as a chance seedling, and is a registered trademark by the Rainier Fruit Company. It is named after Alice Zirkle, a co-founder of the company.

The Lady Alice apple has a dense and crispy texture and a rich heirloom-like complex flavor, sweet with hints of tart. It is typically stored after harvest and sold to the retail customer at the flavor's peak. It is suitable for fresh eating as a snack, as well as for cooking and baking. Among its specialty characteristics is that it does not brown quickly even if cut open, and keeps shape and texture at high temperature baking.

Lady Alice is distinguished from other cultivars with its pink blush over creamy-yellow background; the background color darkens after harvest.

The fruit is harvested in the fall, and can be available between February and May, especially in March when it is at its best.
