= English Russet =

Apple cultivar

'English Russet' apple
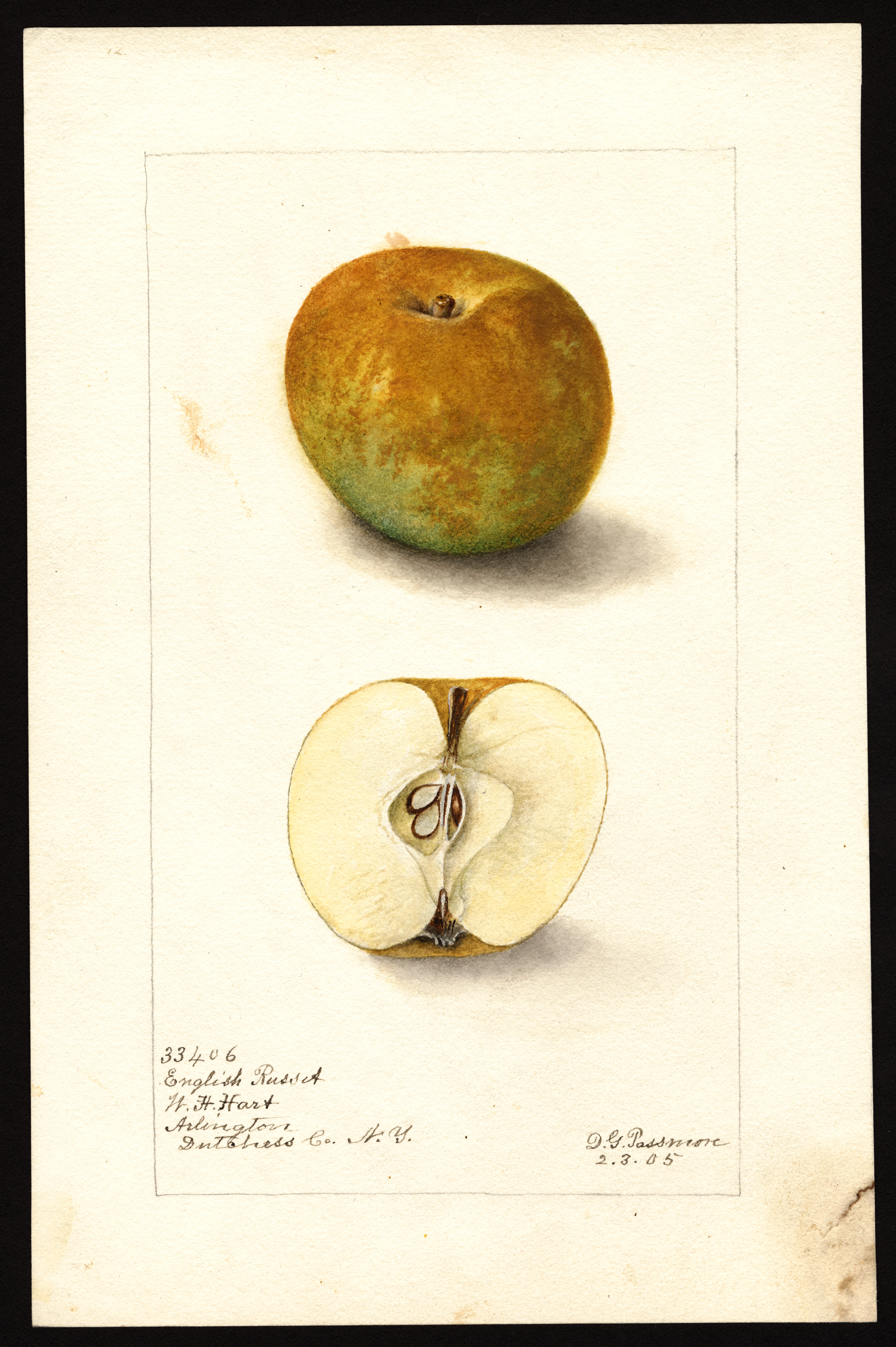
- Genus: Malus
- Species: Malus domestica
- Cultivar: 'English Russet'
- Origin: unknown

'English Russet' is an old cultivar of domesticated apple which keeps exceptionally well in storage. It is a russet apple that makes good cider, is used fresh, but is not very useful as a cooking apple. It has frequently been confounded with 'Golden Russet', which is sometimes known as 'English Golden Russet'.

== See also ==
- 'Roxbury Russet'
