= Belle de Boskoop =

Apple cultivar

'Belle de Boskoop'
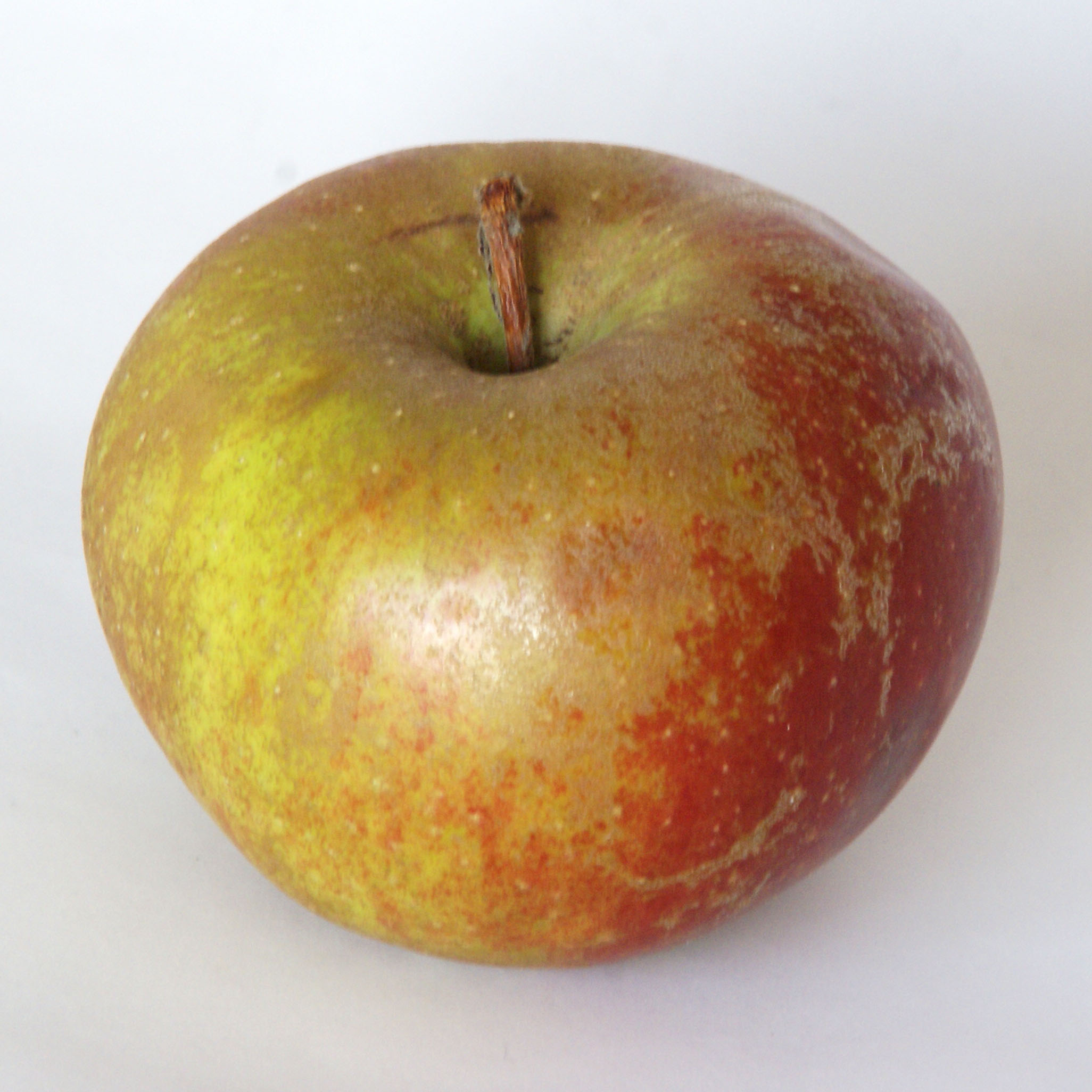
- Hybrid parentage: Chance seedling
- Cultivar: ‘Belle de Boskoop’ or 'Schone van Boskoop'
- Origin: Boskoop, Netherlands, 1856

Belle de Boskoop (also called Goudrenet, Goudreinet or Goudreinnette) is an apple cultivar which originated in Boskoop, Netherlands, where it began as a chance seedling in 1856. Variants include Boskoop red, yellow and green. This rustic apple is firm, tart and fragrant. Greenish-gray tinged with red, the apple stands up well to cooking. Generally Boskoop varieties are very high in acid content and they can contain over four times the vitamin C of Granny Smith or Golden Delicious.

The apple grows well in Normandy, France.

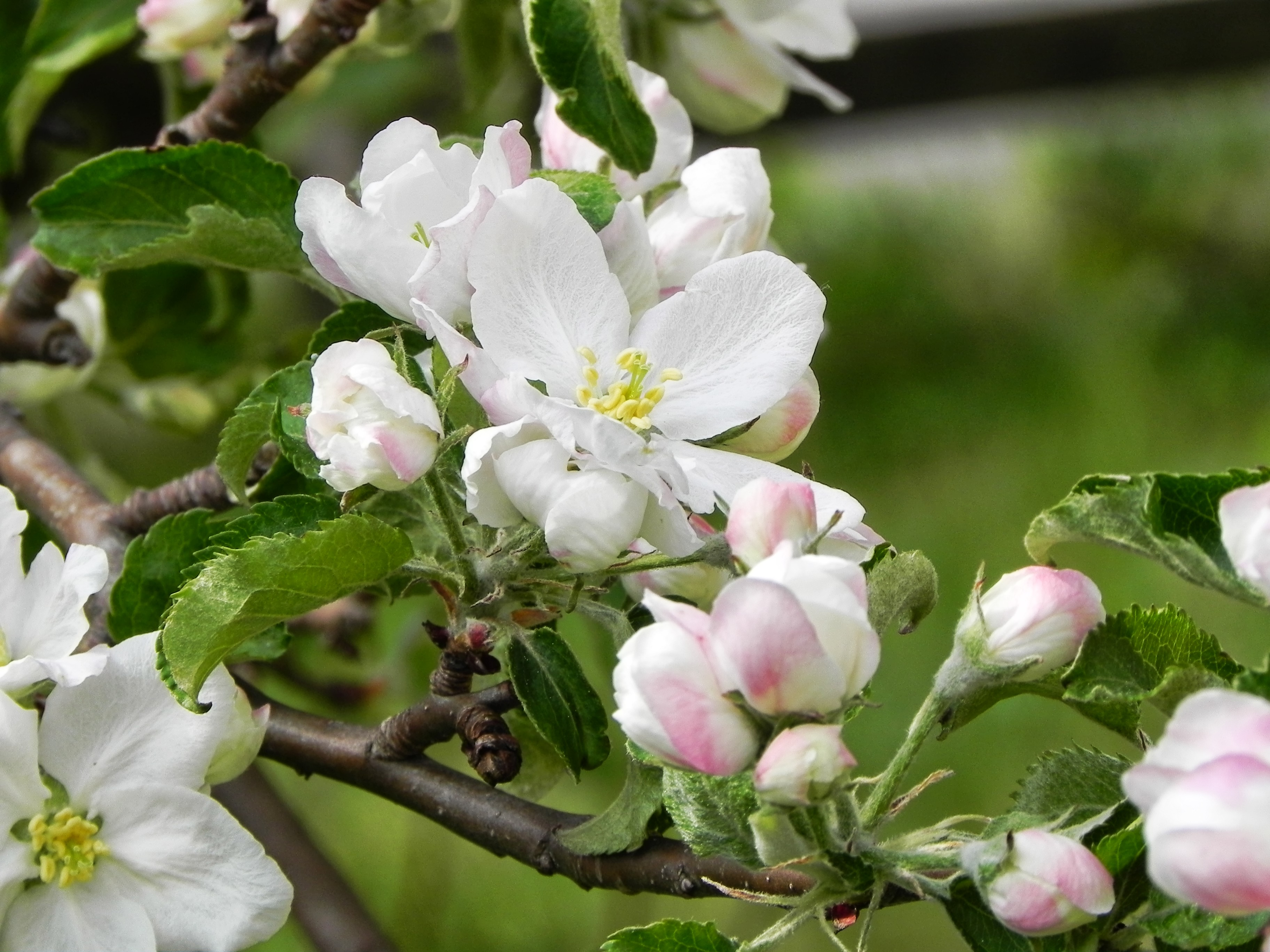
'Belle de Boskoop' apple flowers

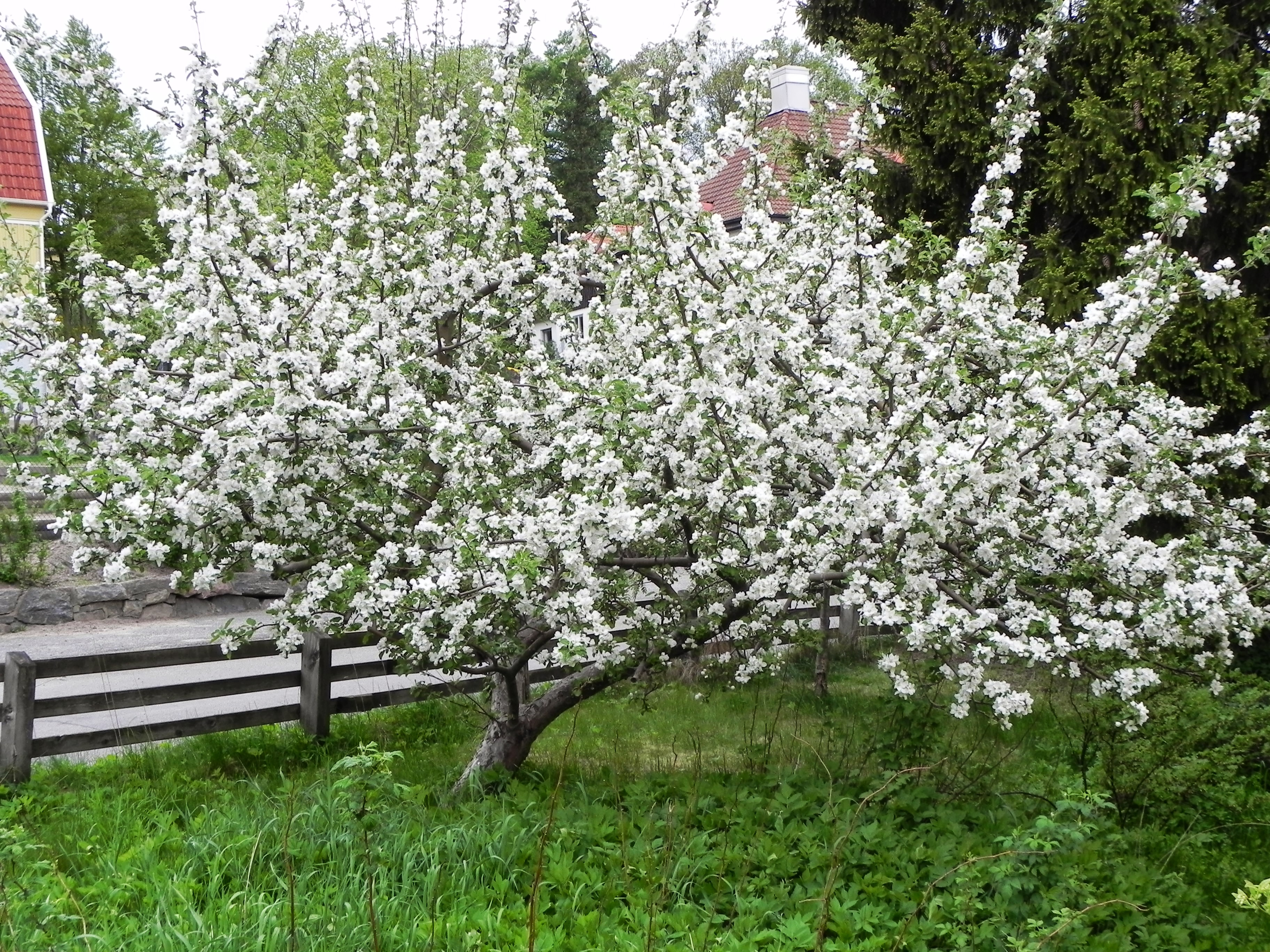
Blossoming 'Belle de Boskoop' apple tree

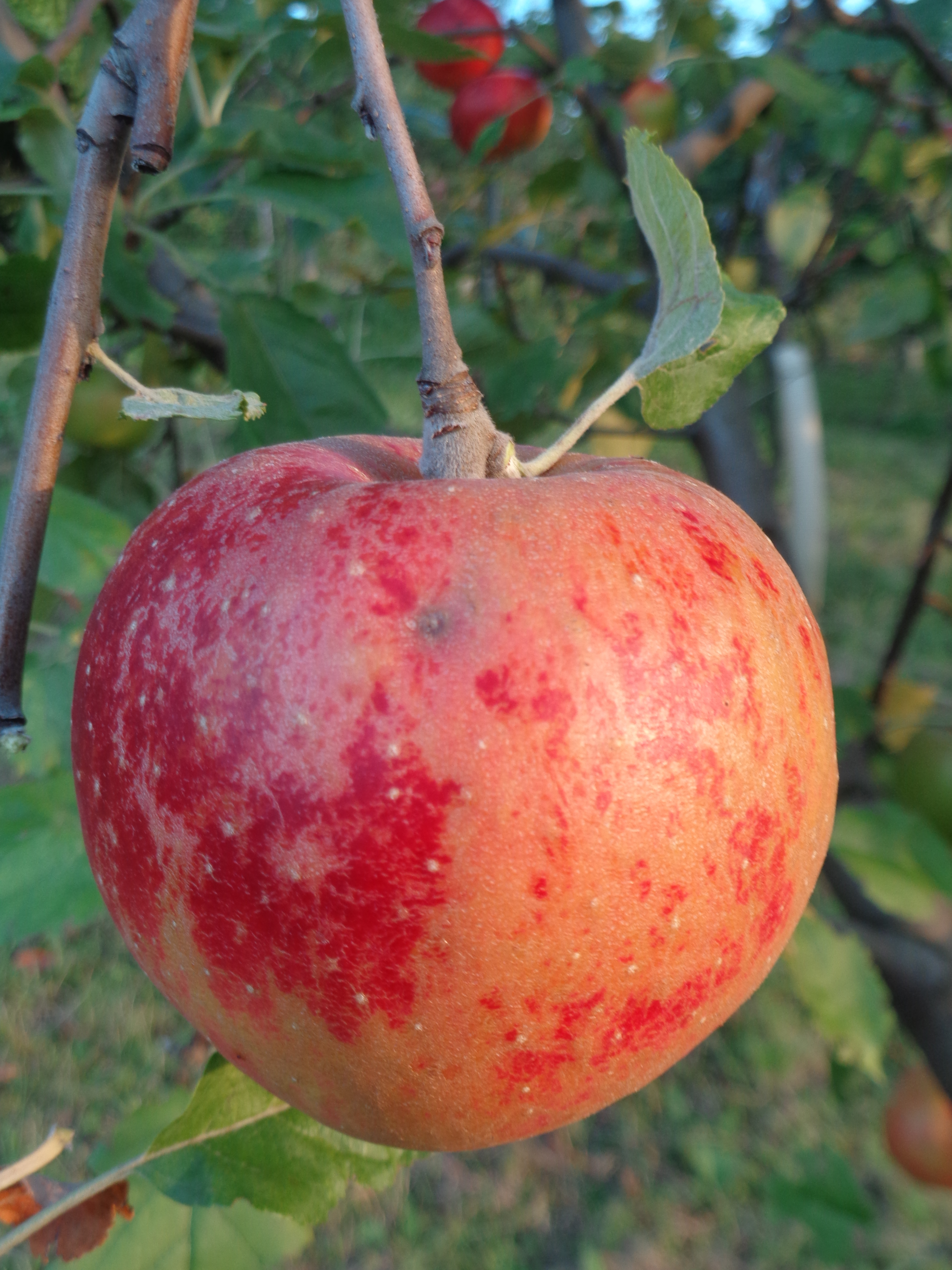
Ripe 'Red Boskoop' on a branch

== Culture ==
The cultivar is compatible with most rootstocks, but its pollen quality is poor because it is a triploid. Cultivars that can provide compatible pollen for 'Belle de Boskoop' include Discovery, James Grieve, Melba and Reine des Reinettes. The apple stores well after harvest.
