= Clarke Pearmain =

Apple cultivar

'Clarke Pearmain'
- Genus: Malus
- Species: M. domestica
- Cultivar: 'Clarke Pearmain'

'Clarke Pearmain', also called 'Golden Pearmain', 'Glouster Pearmain, 'Yellow Pearmain', and possibly the same as 'Columbian Russet', is a medium-sized apple cultivar. It was grown at Monticello by Thomas Jefferson.

== See also ==
- 'King of the Pippins', also called 'Golden Winter Pearmain'
