= Allington Pippin =

Apple cultivar

'Allington Pippin'
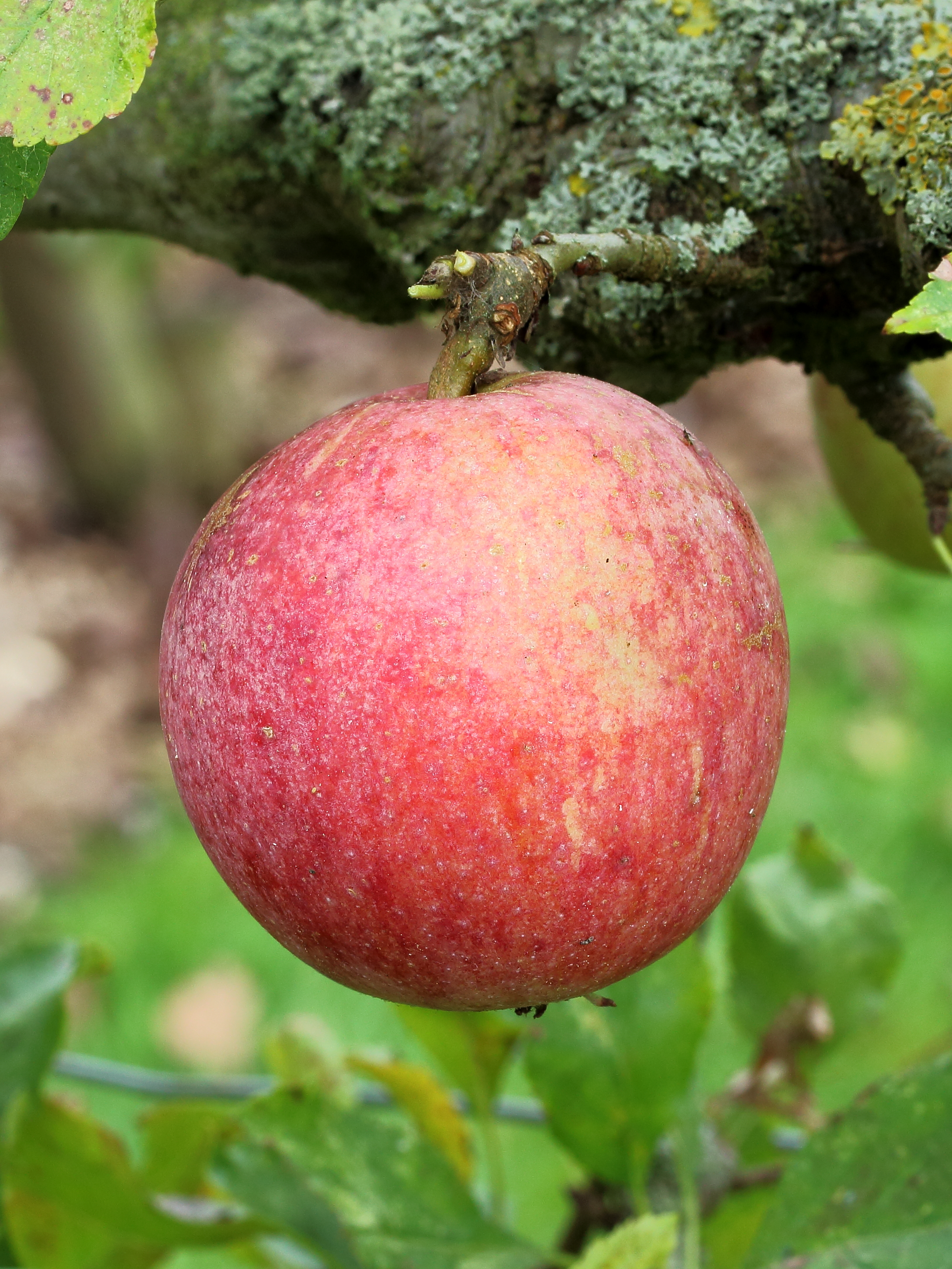
- Genus: Malus
- Species: M. domestica
- Hybrid parentage: 'King of the Pippins' x 'Cox's Orange Pippin'
- Cultivar: 'Allington Pippin'
- Origin: England, Lincolnshire, prior to year 1884

'Allington Pippin' is an English cultivar of domesticated apple, with a strong flavour that includes hints of pineapple.

The Allington Pippin was developed prior to year 1884 by Thomas Laxton in Lincolnshire, England through a cross breeding of Cox's Orange Pippin and the King of the Pippins. This name was not given until 1894, when George Bunyard named it after the village of Allington near Maidstone in Kent, where one of the Bunyard's nurseries was situated.

This apple is conical shaped and its outer skin is combined from flashy colours of red and orange, flushed and striped, with some russeting. Its special mellowing to sharp fruit candy or pineapple flavour is appreciated in multipurpose use: cooking, fresh eating and flavourful apple cider. Allington is rather a strong fruit, it has a good storage record of three months or more, and keeps shape in cooking.

'Allington Pippin' has a biennial bearing tendency, flowers are partially self-sterile, mid season; harvest period is late. The tree is average on general tendency to diseases, but blossom is susceptible to frost.

== See also ==
- Reinette
