= Sturmer Pippin =

Apple cultivar

'Sturmer Pippin'
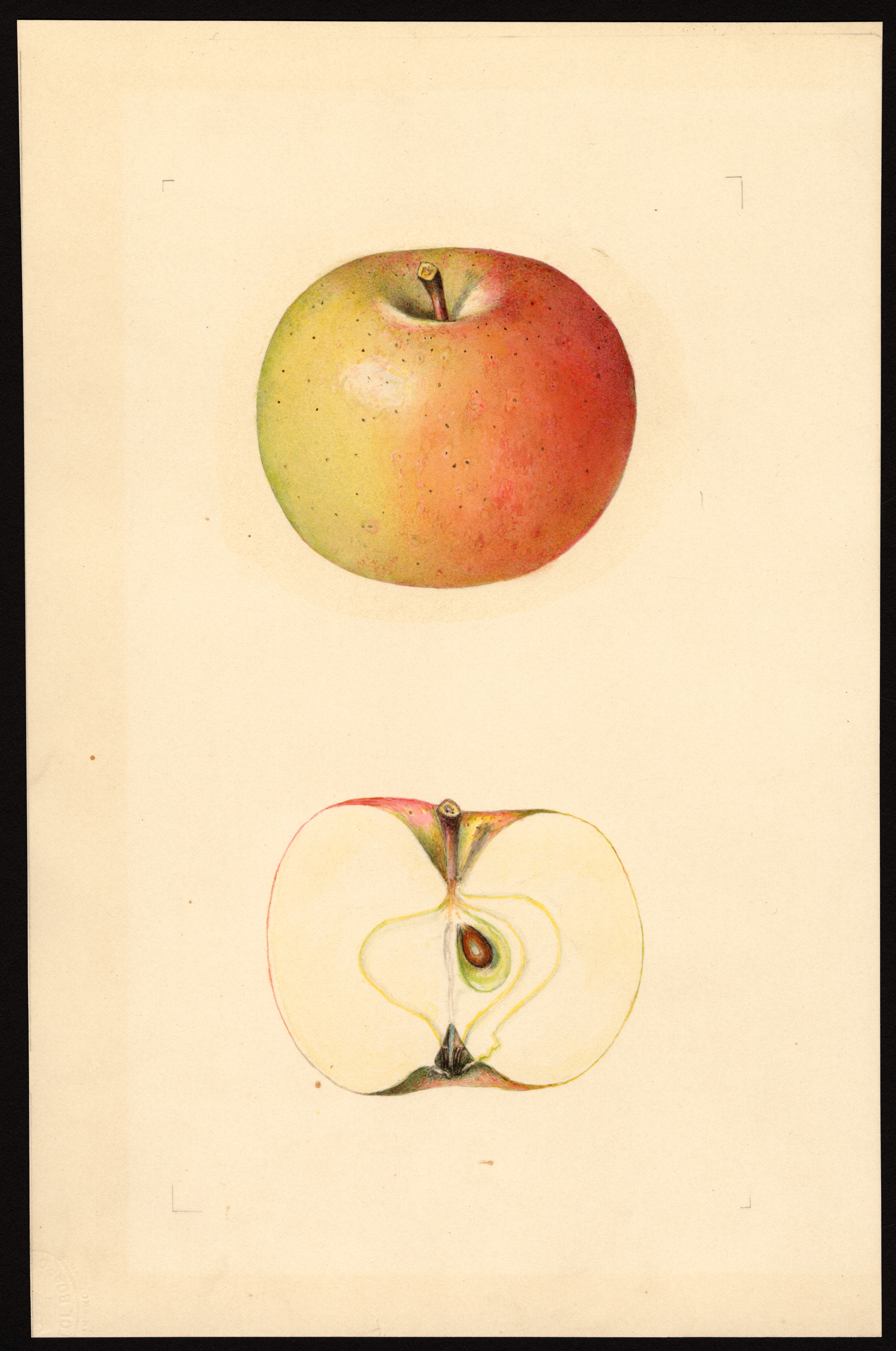
- Hybrid parentage: 'Ribston Pippin' x 'Nonpareil'
- Cultivar: 'Sturmer Pippin'
- Origin: Sturmer, Essex, England, before 1831

The 'Sturmer Pippin' is a dessert apple cultivar, believed to be a 'Ribston Pippin' and 'Nonpareil' cross.

'Sturmer Pippin' is recorded as being presented to the Horticultural Society (later Royal Horticultural Society) by Ezekiel Dillistone in 1827. The apple takes its name from the village of Sturmer, Essex.

== Description ==
This apple is medium-sized, and has a bright green skin becoming greenish to yellow and flushed red. A good picking time is mid-November to late November. One of the best English keeping apples, 'Sturmer Pippin' became widely grown and exported from Tasmania and New Zealand from the 1890s.
