= Knobby Russet =

Apple cultivar

'Knobby Russet'
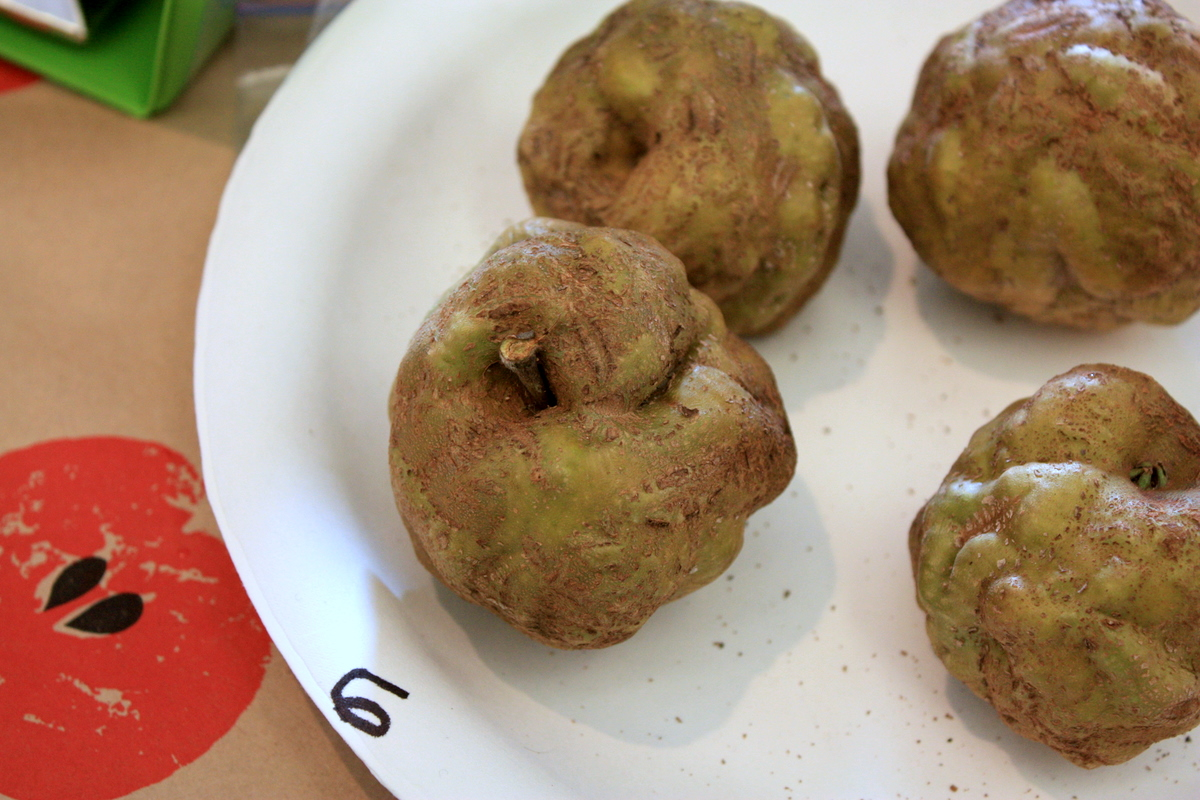
- Genus: Malus
- Species: M. domestica
- Cultivar: 'Knobby Russet'
- Origin: introduced 1820, Sussex, England

The Knobby Russet, also known as Knobbed Russet, Winter Russet, Old Maids, and Winter Apple, is a large green and yellow apple cultivar with a rough and black russet and unusually irregular, warty, and knobbly surface. It has a soft and sweet creamy flesh and looks more like a potato than an apple. Knobby Russets are harvested in mid to late October and are in season between October and February/March.
