= Calville Blanc d'hiver =

Apple cultivar

'Calville Blanc d'hiver'
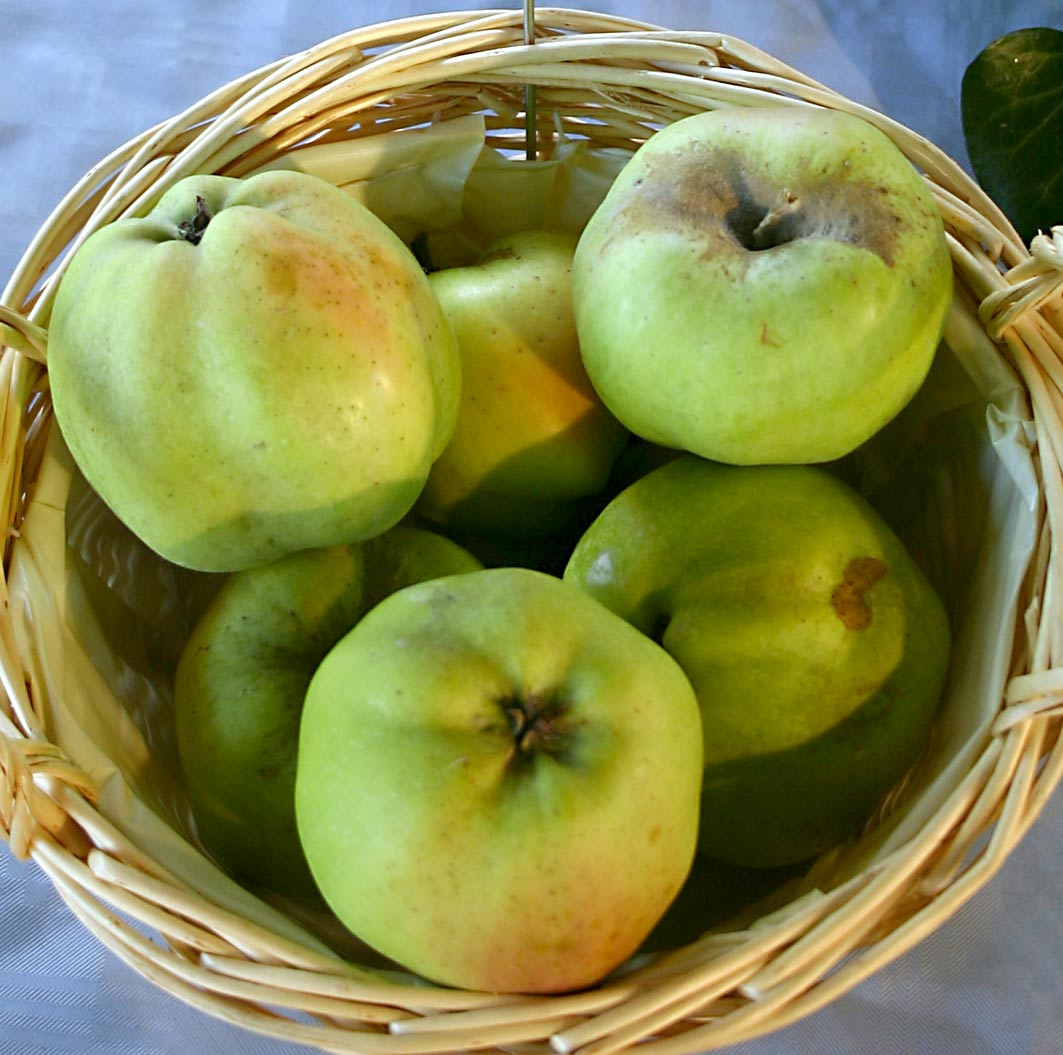
- Hybrid parentage: Chance seedling
- Cultivar: 'Calville Blanc d'hiver'
- Origin: France, 17th century

The Calville Blanc d'hiver (White Winter Calville) is an apple cultivar. It originated in France in the 17th century from a chance seedling.

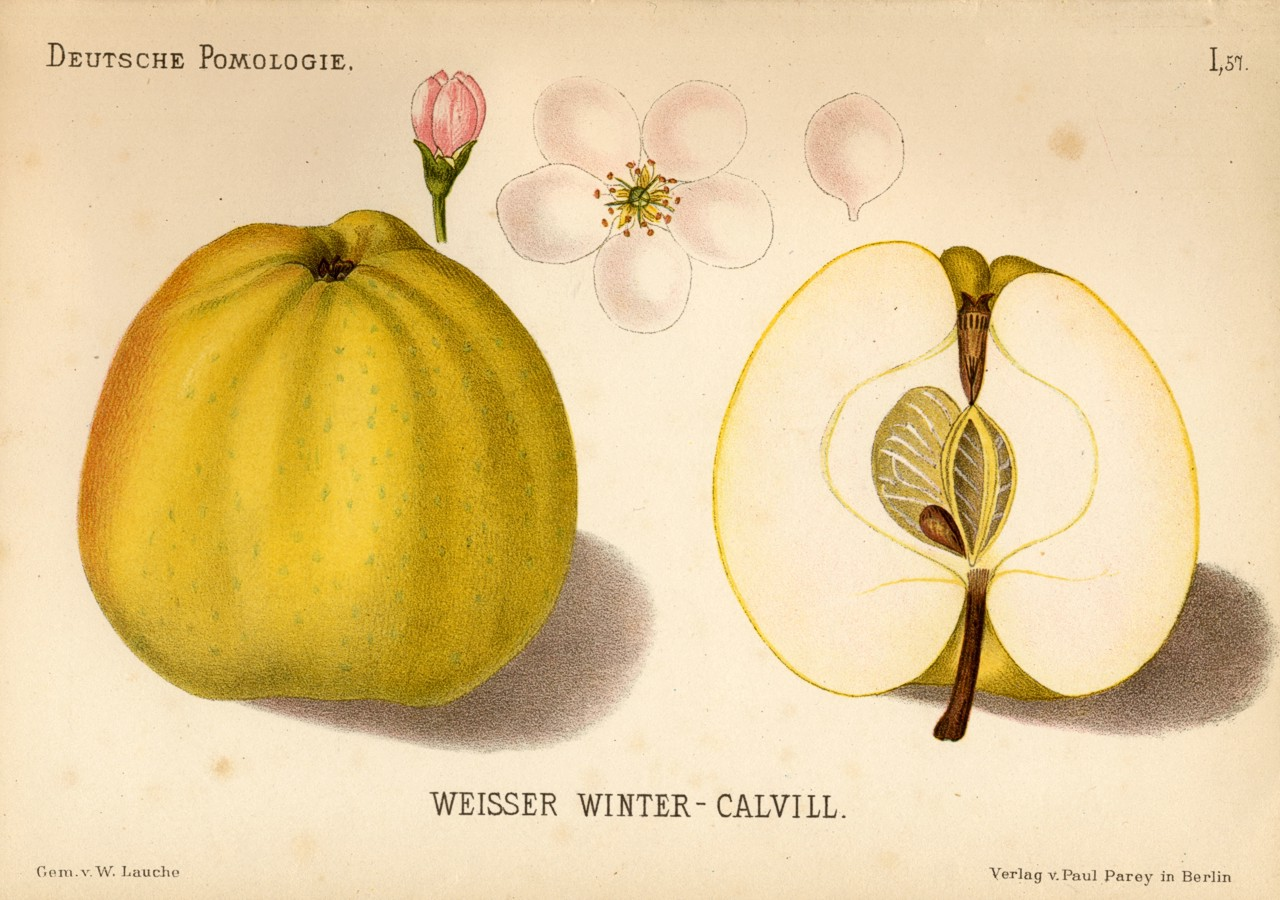
Weisser Winter Calvill, drawn by Wilhelm Lauche

The older apple varieties that carry the name "Calville" was very popular in Germany and France and are notable for their unusual look (the sides are somewhat lumpy). Calville Blanc d'hiver apples have excellent flavor and an unusually high amount of vitamin C. It is the preferred apple for Tarte Tatin in France.

'Calville Blanc' is one of the apples grown at Monticello by Thomas Jefferson.

== See also ==
- Ellison's Orange (apple)
