= Reinette du Canada =

Apple cultivar

'Canada Reinette' apple
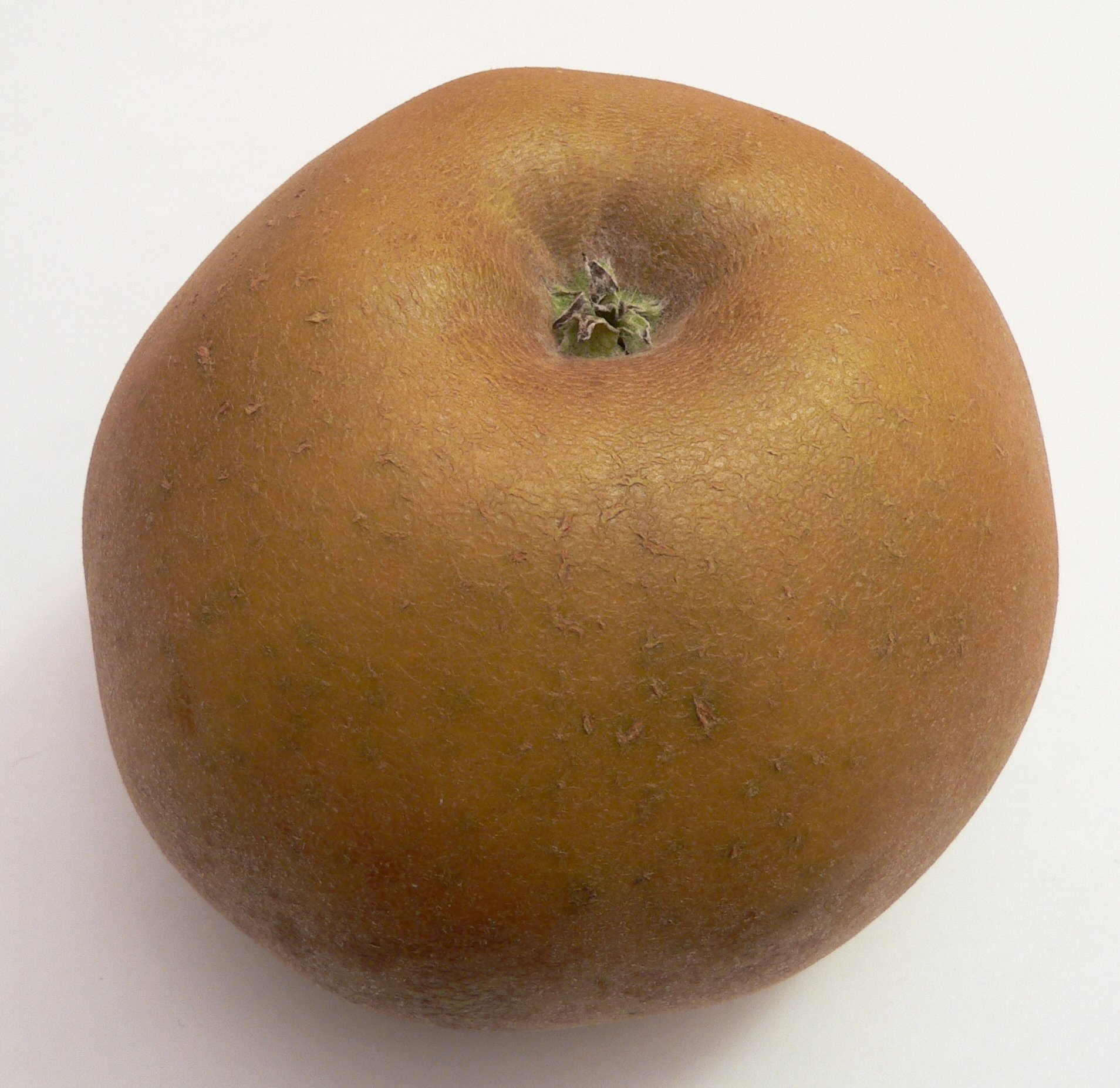
- 'Reinette Grise du Canada', probably a sub-cultivar
- Genus: Malus
- Species: Malus domestica
- Hybrid parentage: Old French cultivar
- Cultivar: 'Canadian Reinette'
- Origin: unknown, before 1771

Reinette du Canada or Canada Reinette is an old cultivar of domesticated apple of unknown origin grown in Europe under various names and listed in France as a Canadian apple at least as early as 1771. It is a reinette type of golden apple, with much russeting, which keeps shape in cooking and is mainly used for that purpose especially in apple strudel.

Even today it is considered as the default russet apple of France, and is also known as the Reinette Blanche du Canada and many more names. Reinette Grise du Canada is probably also a sub cultivar of it, but this is not clear.

The fruit is tart and mostly used for cooking if picked early and used quickly; if stored for some time it gets softer and sweeter and is more often recommended for fresh eating. It blossoms approximately three days after the Cox's Orange Pippin. Typical size: width 83-87 mm, height 59-71 mm, stalk 11-17 mm.

- Reinette du Canada is triploid.
- S genotype S1 S2 S3
- Vitamin C 17 mg/100 gram
- Density 0.80

== Chemical composition ==
Sugar 14.0-16.4%, acid 0.80-0.91%, pectine 0.74-0.77%.

== See also ==
- Golden Russet
