= Sans Pareil (disambiguation) =

Sans Pareil is a steam locomotive that took part in the 1829 Rainhill Trials.

Sans Pareil may also refer to:

- A Spanish-French wine grape also known as Grenache
- A French wine grape known as Jurançon
- The original name of the Adelphi Theatre in London, founded in 1806
- Any of five ships of the French Navy, see French ship Sans Pareil
- Any of three ships of the Royal Navy, see HMS Sans Pareil
- Sanspareil, a landscape garden in Germany

== See also ==
- Nonpareil (disambiguation)
