= Gleed, Washington =

- CDP
- Location of Gleed, Washington
- Coordinates: 46°39′21″N 120°36′14″W
- Country: United States
- State: Washington
- County: Yakima

Area
  - Total: 5.4 sq mi (13.9 km^{2})
  - Land: 5.4 sq mi (13.9 km^{2})
  - Water: 0 sq mi (0.0 km^{2})
- Elevation: 1,257 ft (383 m)

Population (2020)
  - Total: 2,873
  - Density: 535/sq mi (207/km^{2})
- Time zone: UTC-8 (Pacific (PST))
  - Summer (DST): UTC-7 (PDT)
- ZIP code: 98904
- Area code: 509
- FIPS code: 53-26945
- GNIS feature ID: 2408297

Gleed is a census-designated place (CDP) in Yakima County, Washington, United States. The population was 2,873 at the 2020 census.

== Geography ==
According to the United States Census Bureau, the CDP has a total area of 5.4 square miles (13.9 km^{2}), all of it land.

== Recreation opportunities ==
Lower Naches Community Park, a 7.5 acre county park open daily 9:00 a.m. to dusk, has an open grass area for family picnicking and field sports. Children's play equipment is also available.

== Educational facilities ==
The Lower Naches primary school in Gleed closed at the end of the 2015–16 school year and was replaced by a new school in Naches starting the 2016–17 school year.

== Demographics ==
Historical population
Census	Pop.	Note	%±
2000	2,947		—
2010	2,906		−1.4%
2020	2,873		−1.1%
U.S. Decennial Census; 1970 1980 1990; 2000 2010

Gleed first appeared as a census designated place in the 2000 U.S. census.

=== Racial and ethnic composition ===
Gleed CDP, Washington – Racial and ethnic composition Note: the US Census treats Hispanic/Latino as an ethnic category. This table excludes Latinos from the racial categories and assigns them to a separate category. Hispanics/Latinos may be of any race.
Race / Ethnicity (NH = Non-Hispanic)	Pop 2000	Pop 2010	Pop 2020	% 2000	% 2010	% 2020
White alone (NH)	2,613	2,452	2,256	88.67%	84.38%	78.52%
Black or African American alone (NH)	9	9	5	0.31%	0.31%	0.17%
Native American or Alaska Native alone (NH)	14	14	33	0.48%	0.48%	1.15%
Asian alone (NH)	6	12	21	0.20%	0.41%	0.73%
Native Hawaiian or Pacific Islander alone (NH)	3	0	0	0.10%	0.00%	0.00%
Other race alone (NH)	4	1	8	0.14%	0.03%	0.28%
Mixed race or Multiracial (NH)	52	65	129	1.76%	2.24%	4.49%
Hispanic or Latino (any race)	246	353	421	8.35%	12.15%	14.65%
Total	2,947	2,906	2,873	100.00%	100.00%	100.00%

=== 2000 census ===
As of the census of 2000, there were 2,947 people, 1,098 households, and 847 families residing in the CDP. The population density was 550.1 people per square mile (212.3/km^{2}). There were 1,137 housing units at an average density of 212.2/sq mi (81.9/km^{2}). The racial makeup of the CDP was 91.55% White, 0.41% African American, 0.48% Native American, 0.20% Asian, 0.10% Pacific Islander, 5.06% from other races, and 2.21% from two or more races. Hispanic or Latino of any race were 8.35% of the population.

There were 1,098 households, out of which 34.8% had children under the age of 18 living with them, 65.8% were married couples living together, 7.7% had a female householder with no husband present, and 22.8% were non-families. 18.8% of all households were made up of individuals, and 9.1% had someone living alone who was 65 years of age or older. The average household size was 2.67 and the average family size was 3.02.

In the CDP, the age distribution of the population shows 26.4% under the age of 18, 6.0% from 18 to 24, 28.2% from 25 to 44, 25.9% from 45 to 64, and 13.5% who were 65 years of age or older. The median age was 39 years. For every 100 females, there were 98.2 males. For every 100 females age 18 and over, there were 93.4 males.

The median income for a household in the CDP was $44,161, and the median income for a family was $48,950. Males had a median income of $33,511 versus $24,408 for females. The per capita income for the CDP was $20,185. About 2.6% of families and 5.4% of the population were below the poverty line, including 7.0% of those under age 18 and 5.3% of those age 65 or over.
