= Chance seedling =

Plant that is the product of unintentional breeding

A chance seedling is a plant that is the product of unintentional breeding.

Identifying the parent plants of a chance seedling may be difficult. It may be necessary to genetically analyse the seedling and surrounding plants to be sure. Plants that come from the artificial union of gametes from a maternal and paternal source are not chance seedlings.

A chance seedling may be a genetically unique individual with desirable characteristics that is then intentionally bred. The Kindred Spirit Hybrid Oak and the Granny Smith, Wolf River, Lady Alice, Red Delicious, Gravenstein, Braeburn, Samarbehisht Chausa, Calville Blanc d'hiver, Belle de Boskoop and Baldwin apples are examples of varieties that started with chance seedlings that were selected and assigned cultivar status owing to their desirable properties.

== See also ==
- Volunteer (botany)
