= Egremont Russet =

Apple cultivar

Malus domestica 'Egremont Russet'
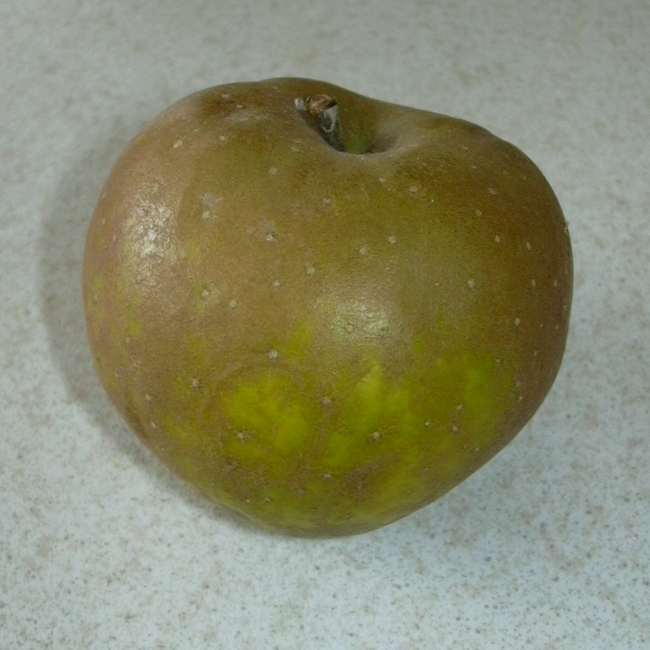
- Cultivar: 'Egremont Russet'

The Egremont Russet is a cultivar of dessert apple, of the russet type. It has a rich, nutty flavour and crisp, firm and fairly juicy flesh.

It was first recorded in 1872, and is believed to have been raised by the Earl of Egremont at Petworth in Sussex, UK.

It was first popular in the Victorian era and has remained popular ever since. It is the fourth most common apple in commercial cultivation in England & Wales after Cox's Orange Pippin, Bramley, and Gala, although its 277 ha represents just 3.9% of total apple orchards.

It is a popular garden apple in the United Kingdom (UK) and trees are widely available from UK garden centres.
