= Isaac Ashmead =

Printer in Philadelphia, Pennsylvania

- Born: December 22, 1790; Germantown, Pennsylvania
- Died: March 1, 1870 (aged 79); Philadelphia, Pennsylvania
- Occupation(s): Printer and publisher
- Notable work: Introduced the power printing press in Philadelphia
- Spouse: Belina Farren (m. 1828)
- Parent(s): Jacob and Mary (Nagless) Ashmead

Isaac Ashmead (December 22, 1790 – March 1, 1870) was a printer in Philadelphia, Pennsylvania.

He was born in Germantown to Jacob and Mary (Nagless) Ashmead, part of a family which settled in Philadelphia at the start of the Pennsylvania colony. His father had served in the American Revolution, and Isaac Ashmead later served in the War of 1812.

William Bradford, a Philadelphia printer, taught him the art of printing. In 1821 he opened his own printing business, one which he owned and operated until his death. Ashmead soon became a pioneer in his field by introducing the powren er printing press in Philadelphia, the composition roller and the hydraulic press for smooth-pressing wet sheets. He also managed the Philadelphia Institute for Apprentices, helped establish evening schools and was active in religious services. However, he was primarily noted for founding and printing for the Sunday and Adult School Union, the predecessor to the commonly known American Sunday School Union in the United States.
