= King of the Pippins =

Apple cultivar

'King of the Pippins'
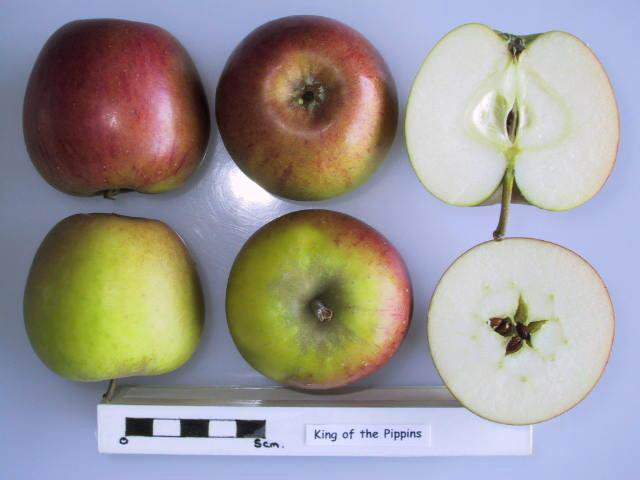
- Genus: Malus
- Species: M. domestica
- Cultivar: 'King of the Pippins'
- Origin: France

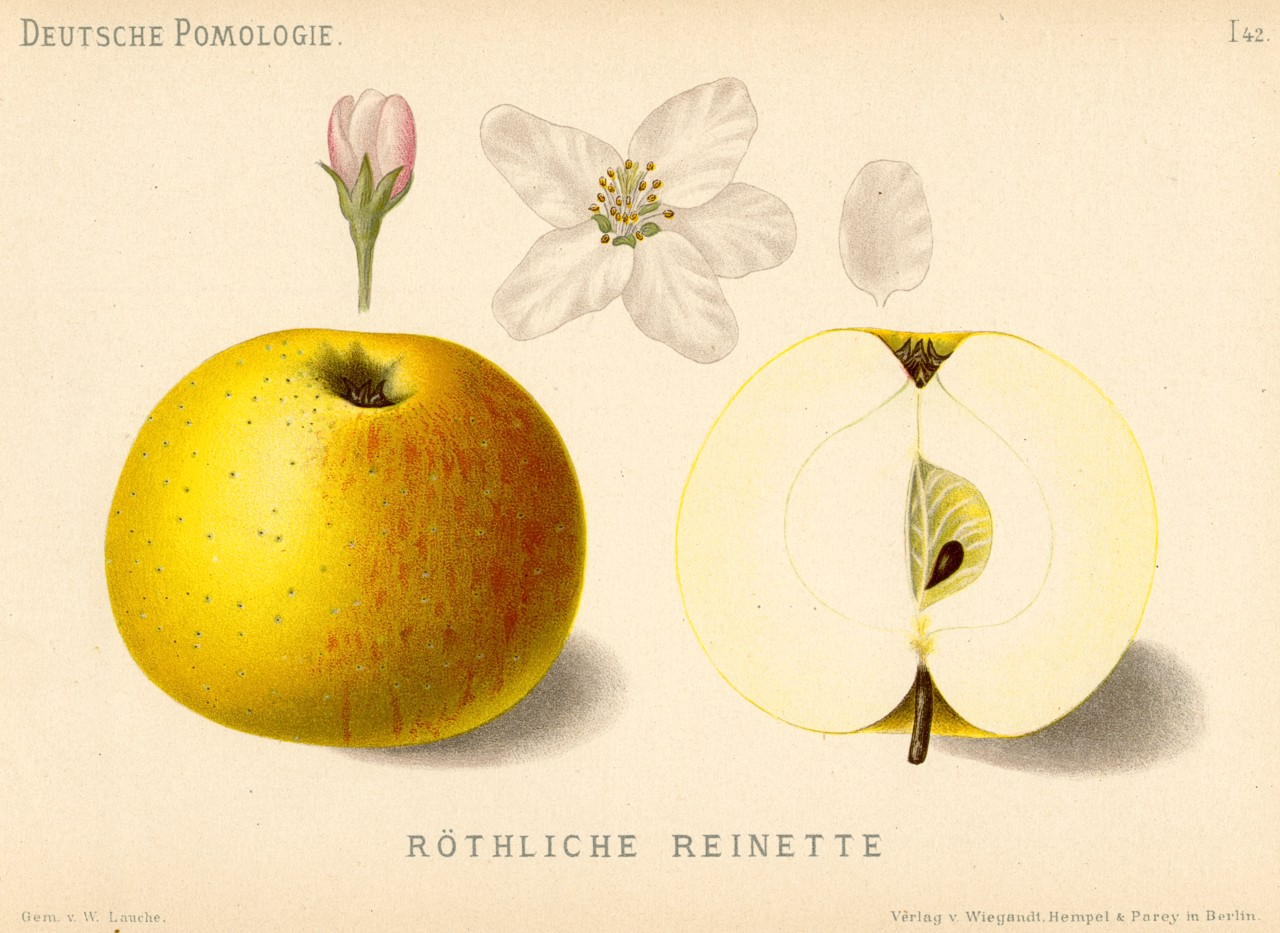
'King of the Pippins' in Deutsche Pomologie

King of the Pippins or Reine des Reinettes (French), Goldparmäne, Wintergoldparmäne (German) is an old cultivar of domesticated apple originating from France, and is still used in its original form as well as in many derivative cultivars that have been bred from it. It was also formerly known as Golden Winter Pearmain, because of its ripening period at late fall.

Unlike most apple cultivars it is slightly self-fertile.

It earned the Award of Garden Merit by the Royal Horticultural Society in 1993.

- Density 0.83 g/cc
- Sugar 12,5%
- Acidity 7.7 g/litre
- Vitamin C 15 mg/100g.

== See also ==
- 'Allington Pippin'
- 'Clarke Pearmain', also known as 'Golden Pearmain'
- Reinette
