= Nonpareil (apple) =

Apple cultivar

'Nonpareil'
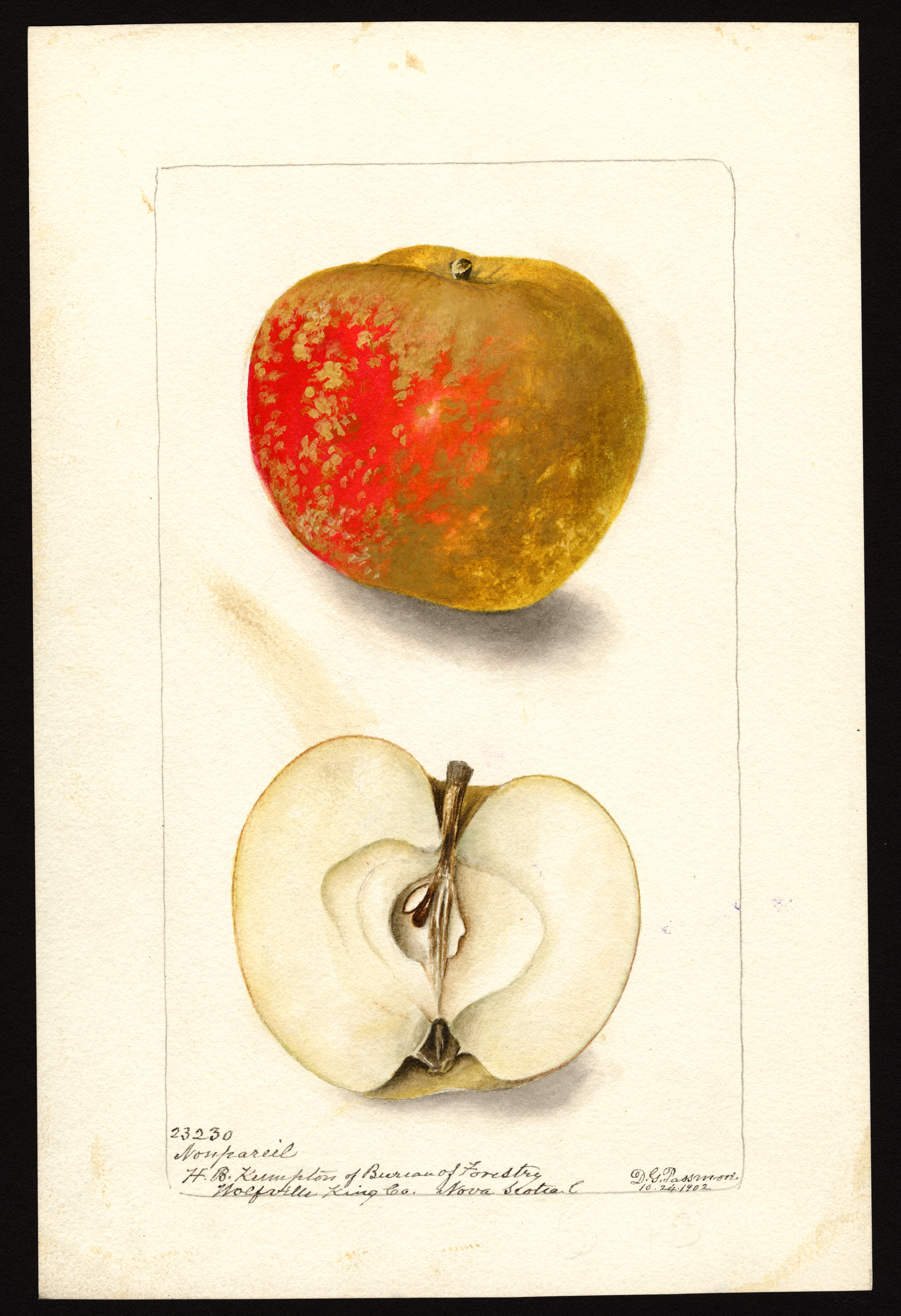
- Genus: Malus
- Species: M. domestica
- Cultivar: 'Nonpareil'

'Nonpareil' is a class of old apple cultivars. It is a type of russet apple.

From England

- Braddick's Nonpareil
- Early Nonpareil
- Lodgemore Nonpareil
- Martin Nonpareil
- Morris's Nonpareil Russet
- Nonpareil(syn. Old Nonpareil)
- Petworth Nonpareil
- Pitmaston Nonpareil
- Scarlet Nonpareil
- Swenny Nonparael

From Ireland

- Ross Nonpareil

From America

- Fleet's Nonpareil
- Foote's Nonpareil
- Ohio Nonpareil

Origin unknown

- French Nonpareil
- White Nonpareil
