= Ribston Pippin =

Apple cultivar

'Ribston Pippin'
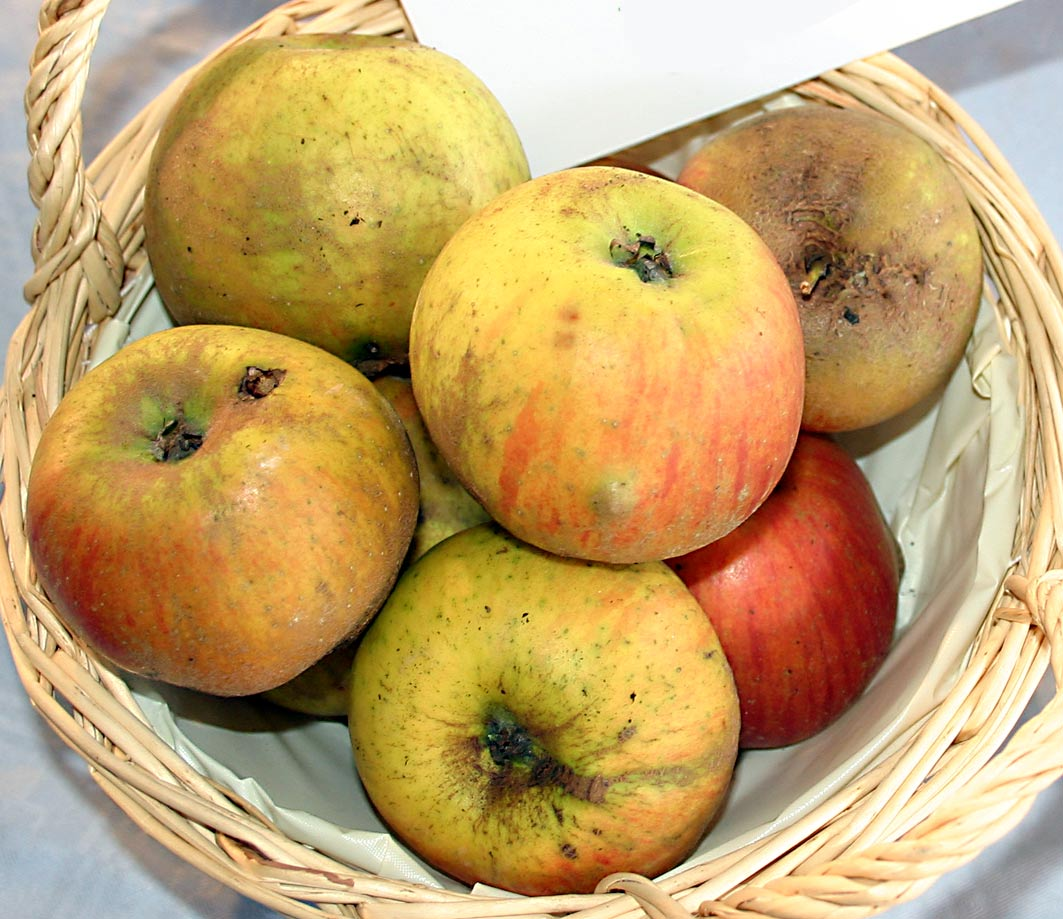
- Genus: Malus
- Cultivar: 'Ribston Pippin'
- Origin: England, Yorkshire, 1708

'Ribston Pippin' is a triploid cultivar of apples, also known by other names including 'Essex Pippin', 'Beautiful Pippin', 'Formosa', 'Glory of York', 'Ribstone', 'Rockhill's Russet', 'Travers', and 'Travers's Reinette'.

== Origin ==
This apple was grown in 1708 from one of three apple pips sent from Normandy to Sir Henry Goodricke of Ribston Hall at Little Ribston near Knaresborough, Yorkshire; the original trunk did not die until 1835. It then sent up a new shoot and, on the same root, lived until 1928. It was found to be a cross between Nonsuch Park and Margil {11}

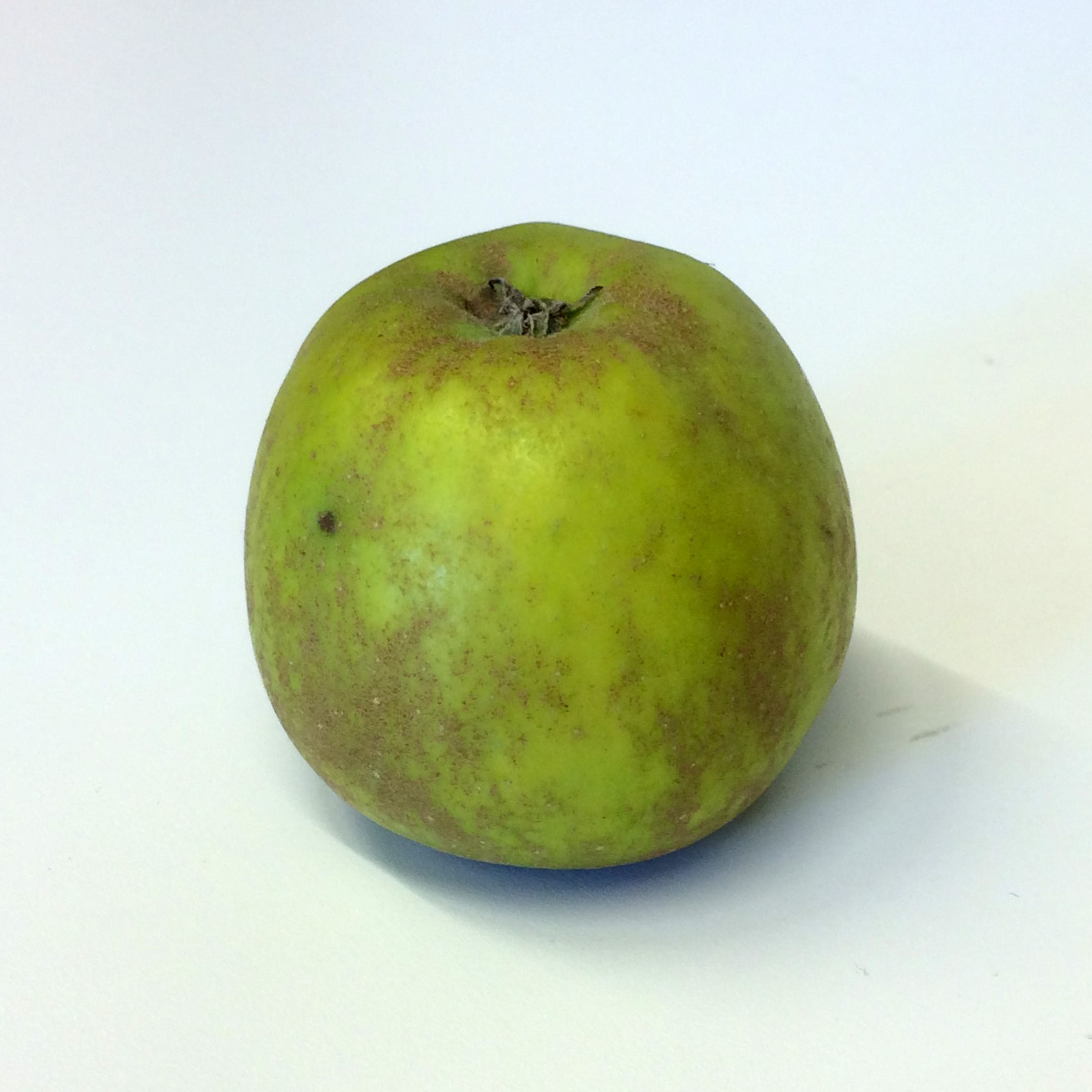
Ribston Pippin.

== Description ==
The apple skin is a yellow, flushed orange, streaked red with russet at the base and apex. The yellow flesh is firm, fine-grained, and sweet with a pear taste. Irregularly shaped and sometimes lopsided, the apple is usually round to conical in shape and flattened at the base with distinct ribbing. Weather conditions during ripening cause a marbling or water coring of the flesh, and in very hot weather, the fruit will ripen prematurely.

- S genotype S1 S9 S21
- Vitamin C is high 30 mg / 100 gram.

== Culture ==
A vigorous tree with upright growth, its medium-sized ovate to oval-shaped leaves are a deep green color and distinctly folded with sharp, regular, and shallow serrations. The surface of the leaf is smooth and dull with a heavy pubescence.

It is very slow to begin bearing, and the proper pollinators will increase the fruitfulness. 'Lord Lambourne' has been recommended for a pollinator, as well as 'Adam's Pearmain', 'James Grieve', and 'Egremont Russet'.

== In literature ==
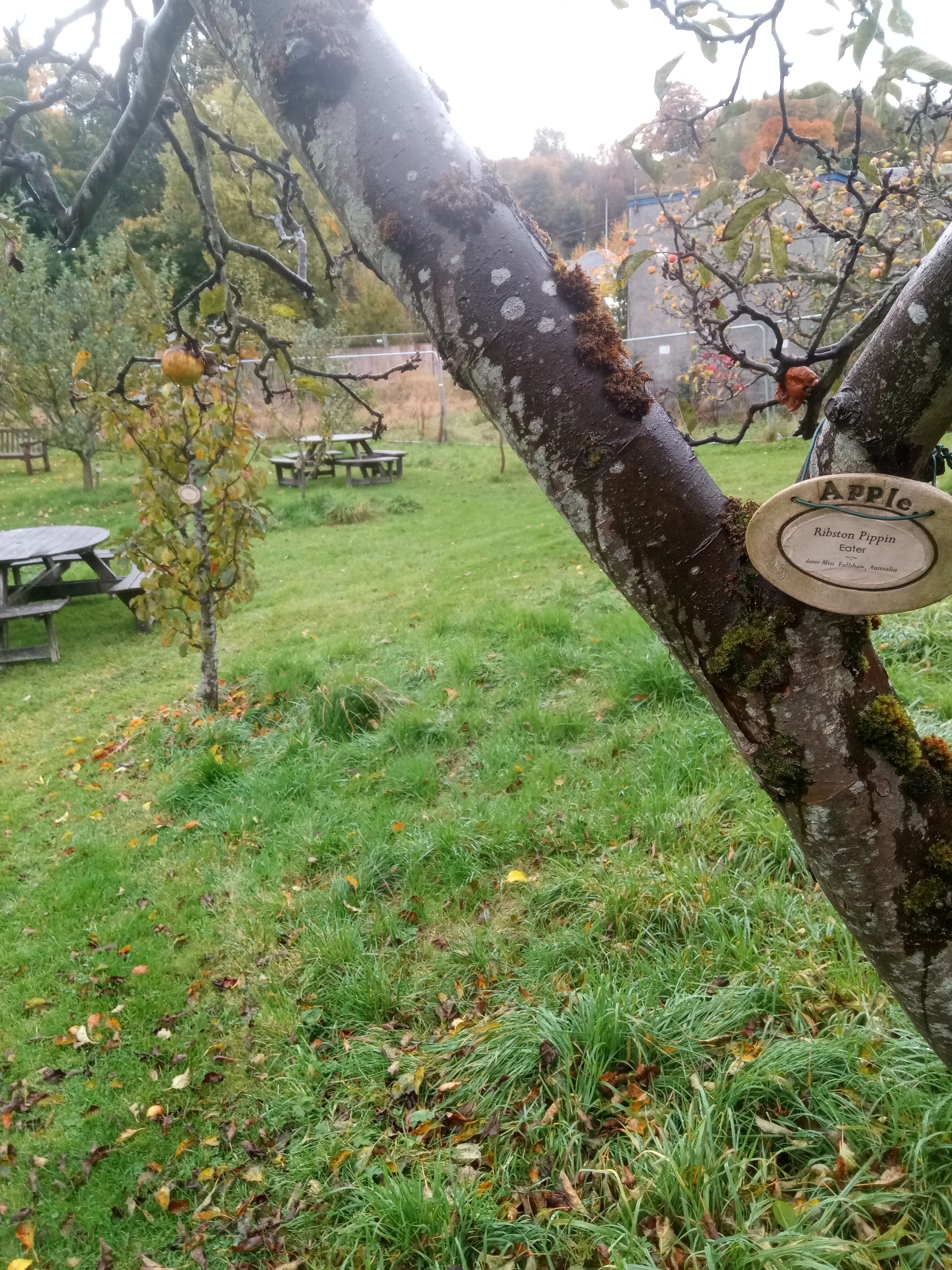
On the tree

The apple appears in a verse by Hilaire Belloc called "The False Heart":

I said to Heart, "How goes it?" Heart replied:
"Right as a Ribstone Pippin!" But it lied.

The apple appears in Thomas Hardy's The Return of the Native in the second book, chapter two: "Now a few russets, Tamsin. He used to like those as well as ribstones."

In the Sherlock Holmes story "The Adventure of Black Peter" in The Return of Sherlock Holmes by Arthur Conan Doyle an incidental character is described as "a little Ribston pippin of a man, with ruddy cheeks and fluffy side-whiskers".

In The Pickwick Papers by Charles Dickens a character is described as a "little hard-headed, Ribston pippin-faced man." Later in the novel a clerk "peeled and ate three Ribston pippins..." In the story "Thoughts about People" in Dickens' Sketches by Boz, a London apprentice is described as having "a watch about the size and shape of a reasonable Ribston pippin..."

Ribston Pippins also appear in the opening lines of Elizabeth Burgoyne Corbett's 1889 utopian novel, New Amazonia: A Foretaste of the Future, in which they are used as a comparison by which to describe the new fruit varieties developed by the year 2472.

Irish writer Helen Wykham's first novel was titled Ribstone Pippins and had Belloc's poem as its epigraph.

In A Month in the Country by J. L. Carr, the vicar's wife Alice Keach says to protagonist Tom Birkin, "I've brought you a bag of apples. They're Ribston Pippins; they do well up here; I remember you saying you liked a firm apple."

Ribston Pippins also make an appearance in the Scottish novel, "The Keys of the Kingdom" by A. J. Cronin: "The apple shed was soft with crepuscular twilight. They climbed the ladder to the loft where, space out on straw, not touching, were rows and rows of the Ribston pippins for which the garden was renowned... the taste was delicious. They watched each other eating. When her small teeth bit through the amber skin into the crisp, white flesh, little spurts of juice ran down her chin."
