= Roxbury Russet =

Apple cultivar

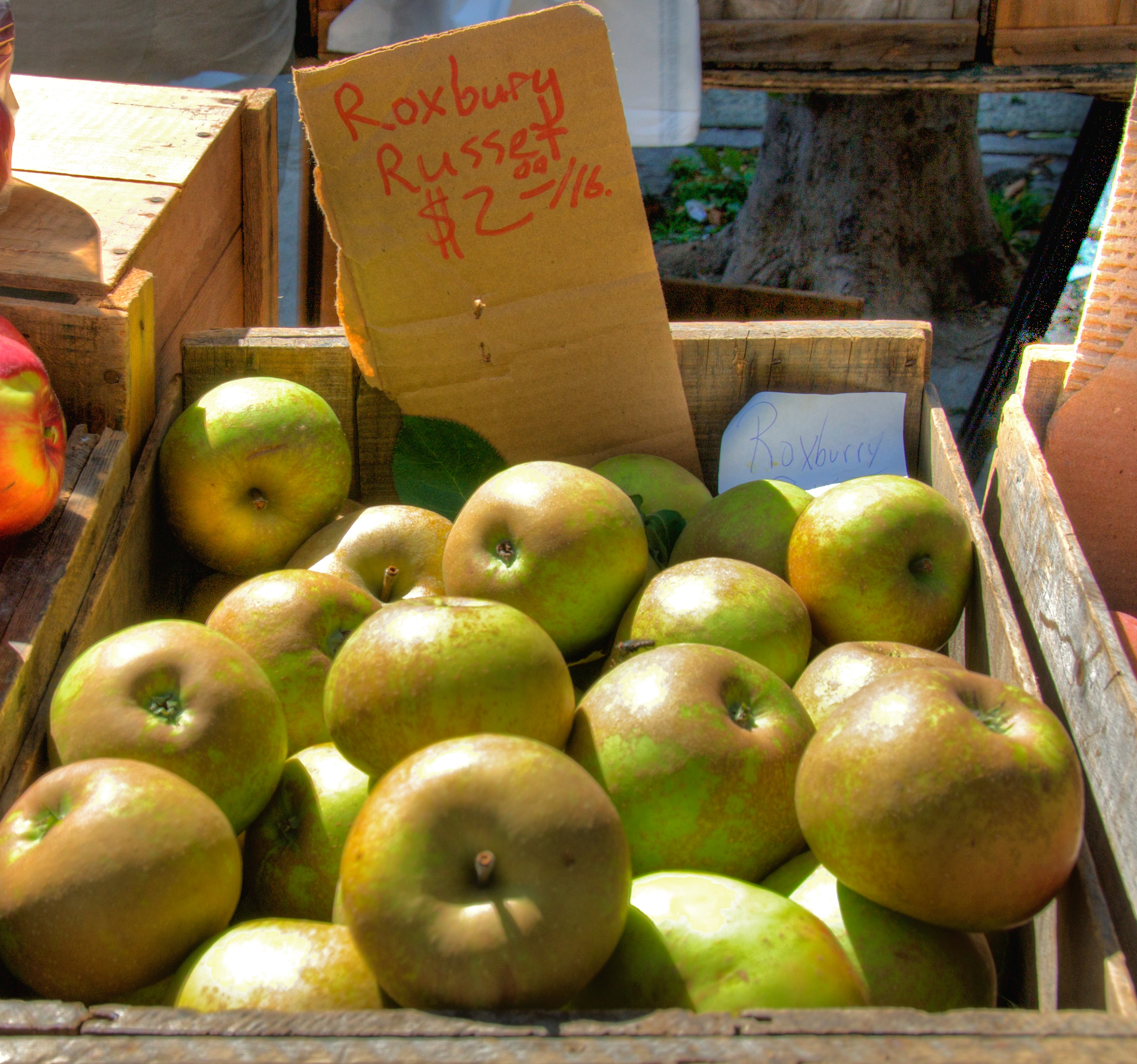
'Roxbury Russet' apples at a market

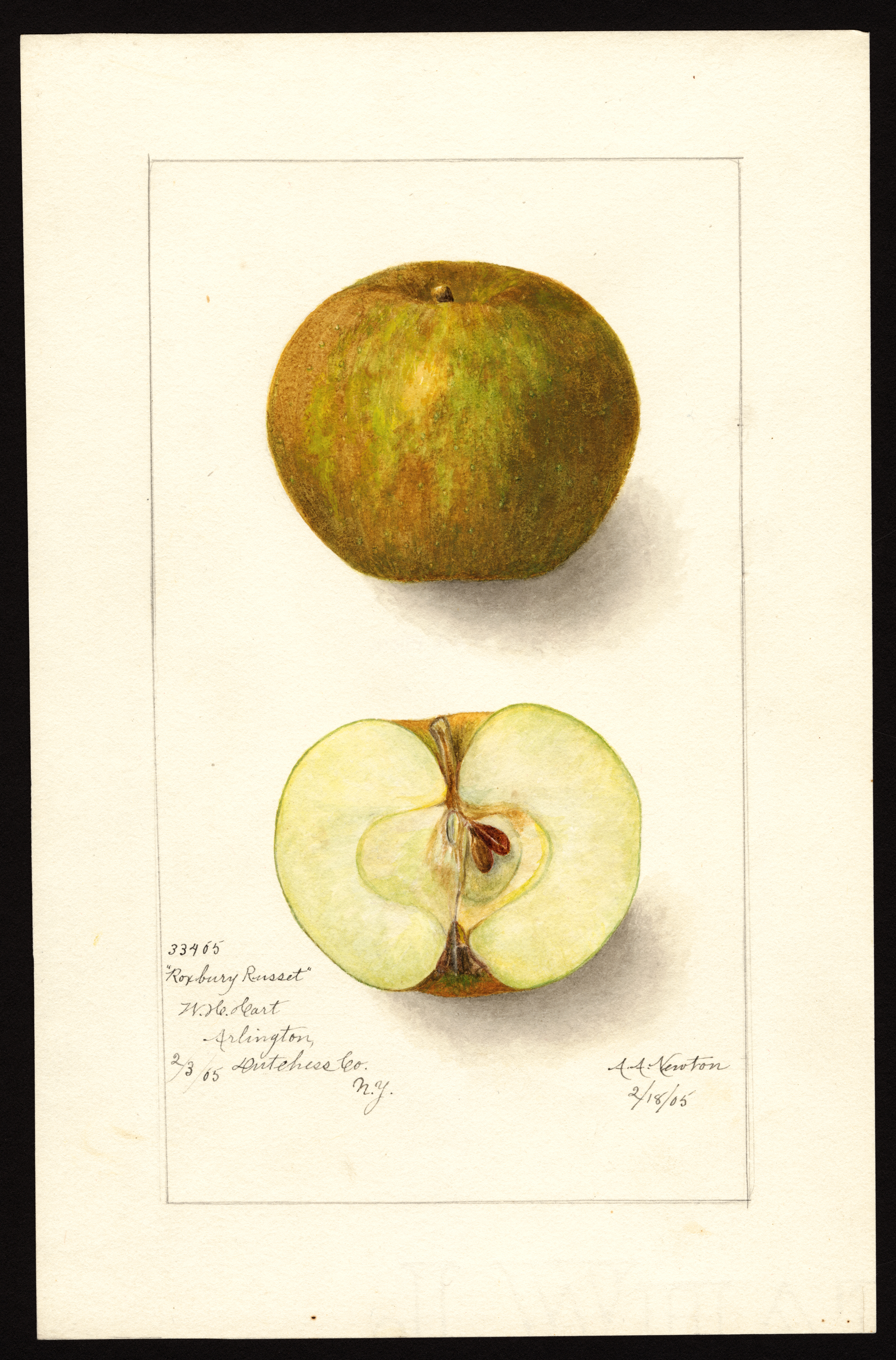
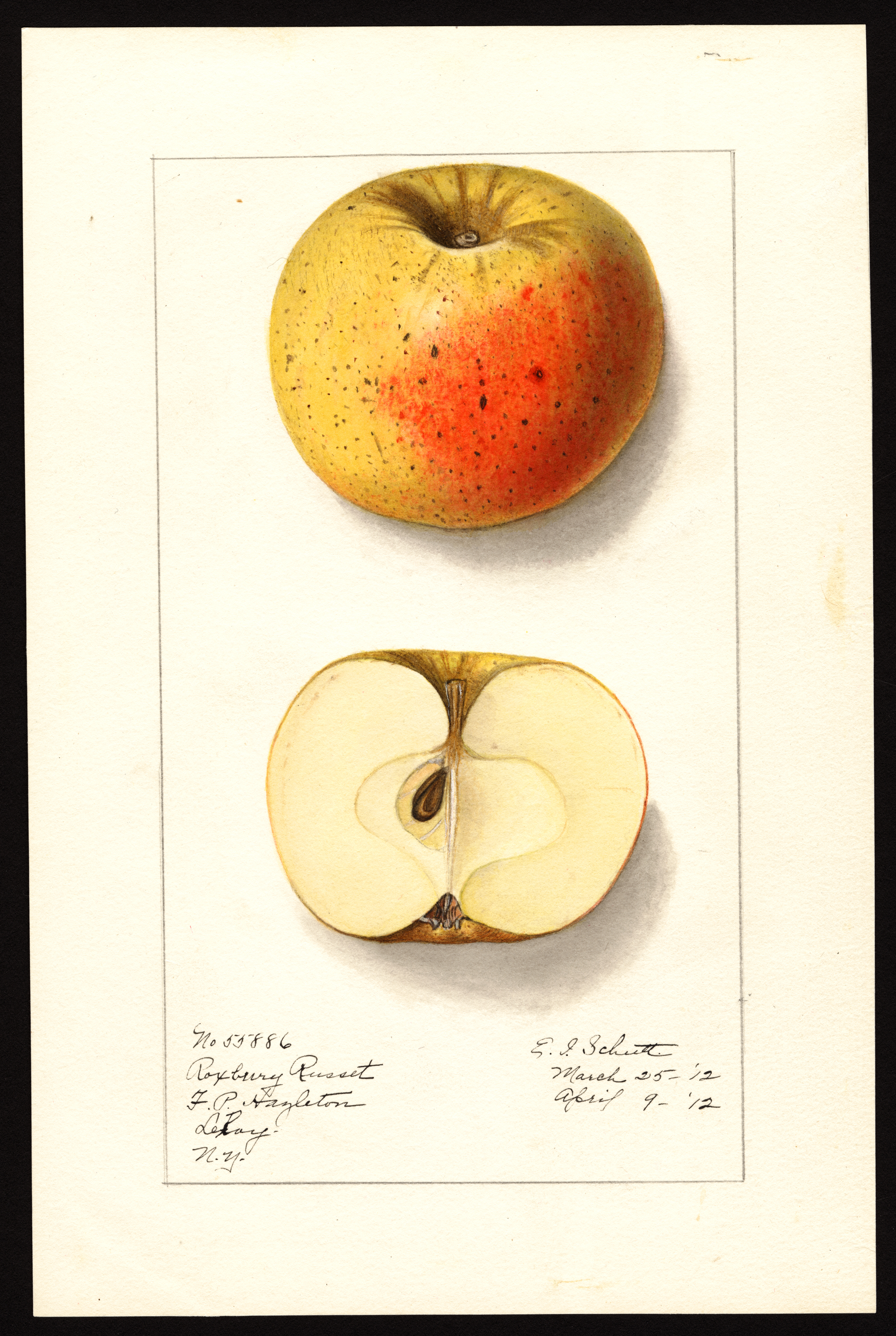
Two watercolor illustrations of Roxbury Russet

The 'Roxbury Russet' is an apple cultivar, believed to be the oldest apple cultivar bred in the United States, having first been discovered and named in the mid-17th century in the former Town of Roxbury, part of the Massachusetts Bay Colony southwest of (now part of) Boston. It is known by several other names including 'Boston Russet', 'Putnam Russet', and 'Sylvan Russet'.

It is a greyish-green russet apple known for its good winter-keeping qualities, as well as its suitability for making cider and juice. It is not widely grown or commercially available due to general commercial disfavor for russet varieties; the dull and heavily marked face makes it hard to sell now. It is available from growers who specialize in heirloom plants. It ripens from September to October, and so is commonly available in autumn in farmers markets in the Northeast. Each apple contains 12.87% sugar that ferments to 6% alcohol in hard cider production.

- Typical size: width 77-89 mm, height 59-76 mm, stalk 12-26 mm.
- Core closed
- Eye medium closed
- Flesh is yellow-green, firm and coarse-textured, suited for eating fresh and cooking.
- Seeds numerous, angular, imperfect.
- Tree vigorous, spreading.

Propagation wood of 'Roxbury Russet' (it propagates by grafting) was taken to Connecticut soon after 1649. Thomas Jefferson planted a number of 'Roxbury Russet' trees in Monticello's South Orchard in 1778.

The Roxbury Russet apple was one of the varieties grown by Major General Israel Putnam on his farm in Pomfret, Connecticut. His grandson, also named Israel Putnam, introduced this variety to the Ohio Valley in 1796. The grandson received a total of 23 varieties of apple from Connecticut in that year, most of which probably came from his grandfather's farm. The Putnam Russet (Roxbury Russet) was considered to be the best and most profitable winter apple of all the varieties received, and was regarded as a good "keeper" (an important characteristic in an age before refrigeration). And not only a good keeper, but if we are to believe Nathaniel Hawthorne, one that improves with age. For in The House of the Seven Gables, Uncle Venner remarks, “But I suppose I am like a Roxbury russet, – a great deal the better, the longer I can be kept.”

== Current cultivation ==
=== Scionwood ===
- Maple Valley Orchards and Nursery, Wisconsin
- Trees of Antiquity, Paso Robles, CA

=== Fruit ===
The historic Shirley-Eustis House museum in Roxbury, Massachusetts, was planted in 1993 with five 'Roxbury Russet' apple trees.

Verellen Orchard in Romeo, Michigan grows Roxbury Russett apples, available at their road-side farm stand. Other orchards include the following:

- Applebrook Farm, Broad Brook, CT
- The Apple Farm—Bates & Schmitt, Philo, CA
- Black Diamond Farm, Trumansburg NY
- Clarkdale Fruit Farm, Deerfield, MA
- Connemara House Farm, Topsfield, MA
- Foggy Ridge Cider, Dugspur, VA
- Greenmantle Nursery, Garberville CA
- Greenwood Farm, Northfield, MA
- Heirloom Orchards, Odell, OR
- Lamb Abbey Orchards, Maine—120 varieties of apple
- Liberty Farm, NJ
- McLeod Brothers Orchard, Milford, NH
- Magicland Farms, Fremont, MI
- Meadowbrook Orchards, Sterling, MA
- Nashoba Winery, Bolton, MA
- Pavolka Fruit Farm, Michigan City, IN
- Rogers Orchards, Southington, CT
- Russell Orchards, Ipswich, MA
- Shelburne Orchards, Shelburne, VT
- Treelicious Orchards, Port Murray, NJ
- Steiner Flat Orchard, Douglas City, CA—Trinity Heritage Orchard Project, University of California Cooperative Extension
- Vintage Virginia Apples, North Garden, VA
