= Ashmead's Kernel =

Apple cultivar

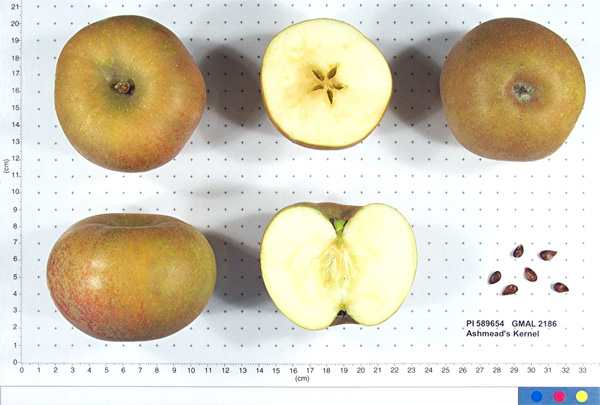
- Species: Malus domestica
- Cultivar: 'Ashmead's Kernel'
- Origin: Gloucester, England, 18th Century

Ashmead's Kernel is a triploid cultivar of apple. Traditionally, Ashmead's Kernel was thought to be diploid but a poor pollinator.

== Origin ==
Ashmead's Kernel is often reported as having been raised by Dr Ashmead in Gloucester, England in the 18th century. However, Christine Leighton of the Gloucestershire Orchard Group suggests that the originator may have been William Ashmead, a lawyer who died in 1782. This Cultivar is a seedling of Nolan Pippin (3)

== Description ==
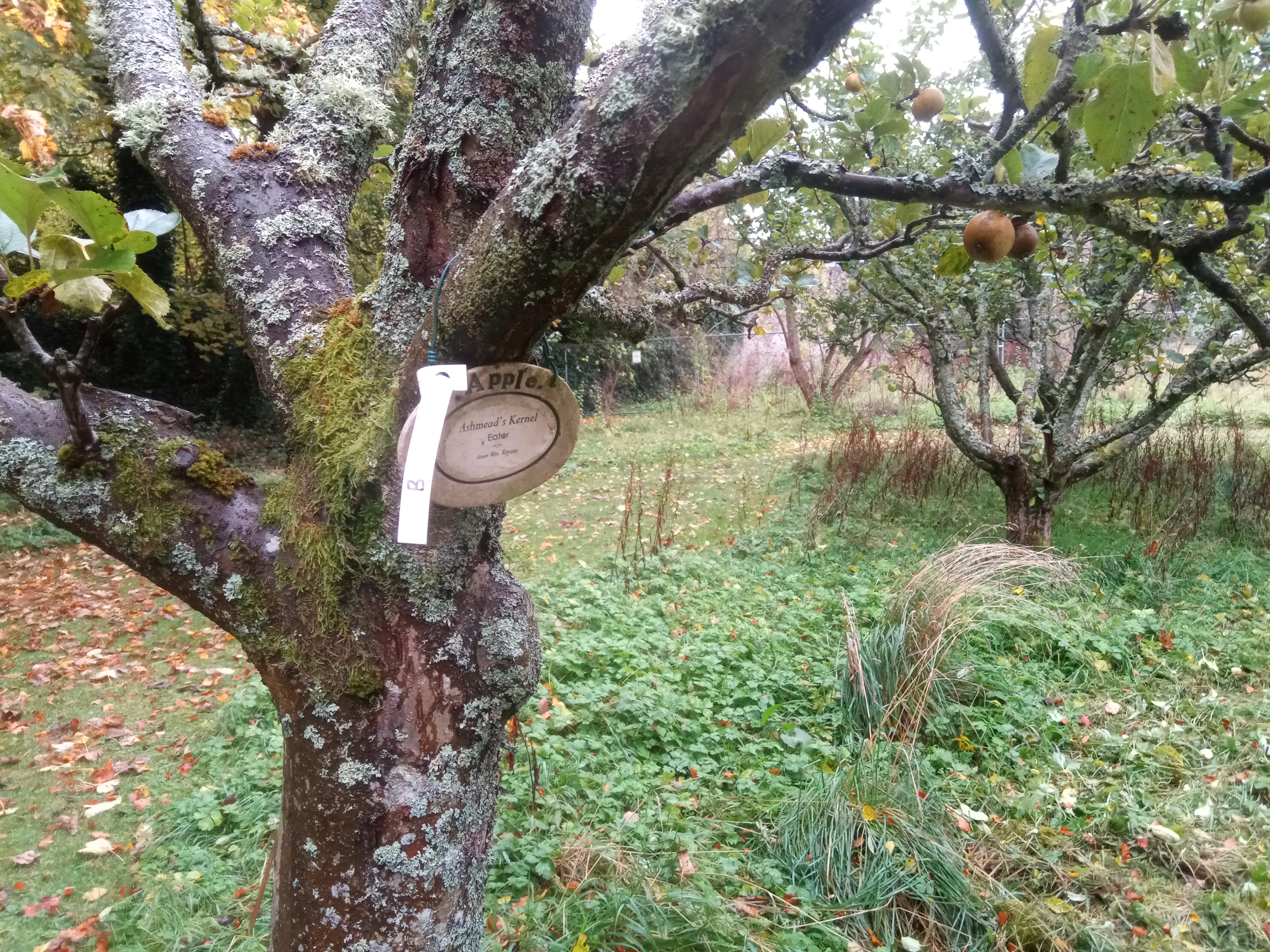
Growing

This dessert apple is of medium size, on average 83mm in diameter on vigorous rootstock and has a flat round shape. The base colour of the apple is greenish yellow, yet has a dull russet colour all over; sometimes there are brownish red stripes. When first cut open, the flesh is white, then it soon develops a brown tint. Ashmead's Kernel makes a good apple juice because of its sweet sharp flavour.

== Culture ==
Produces an upright spreading tree, that generally crops well, though on exposed sites it can be irregular. It is a cultivar that is susceptible to bitter pit, and fire blight. The fruit is generally picked in late October for use between December and February.
