= Apple seed oil =

Vegetable oil extracted from apple seeds

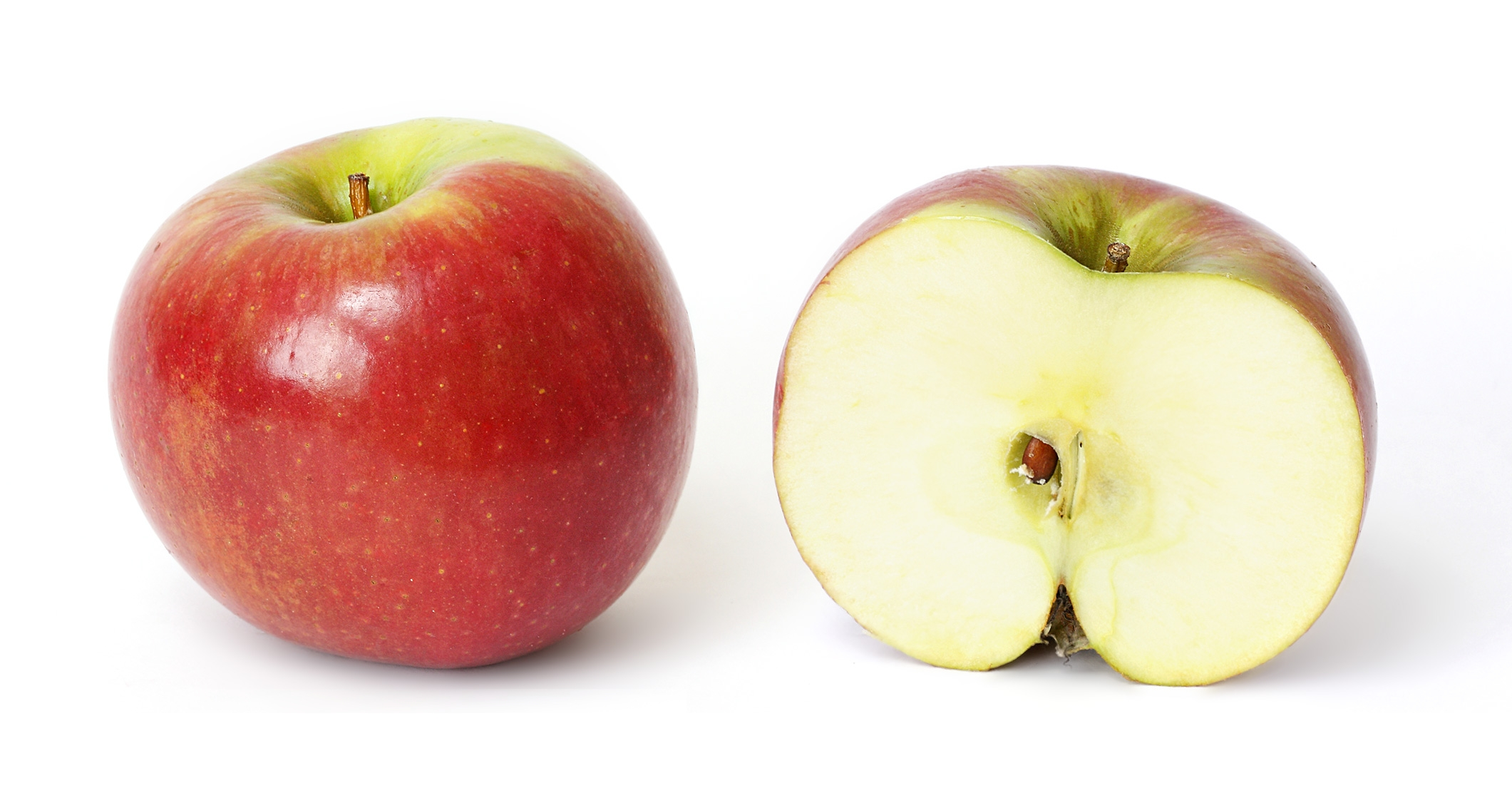
Cross section of an apple, showing seeds from which apple seed oil is produced.

Apple seed oil is a vegetable oil obtained by pressing apple seeds. It is used in manufacturing cosmetics.

Apple seed oil may be used as an edible oil, with the oil cake being used to supplement animal feed.

Apple seed oil has a relatively high iodine value and because of this it is used in the production of alkyd resins, shoe polish and varnish.

== Fatty acid profile ==
Apple seed oils consist of predominantly unsaturated fatty acids, linoleic acid (50.7-51.4%), oleic acid (37.49-38.55%). Saturated fatty acids present in apple seed oil are palmitic acid (6.51-6.60%), stearic acid (1.75-1.96%) and arachidic acid (1.49-1.54%).

== See also ==
- Tomato seed oil
