= An apple a day keeps the doctor away =

19th-century English proverb

"One apple a day keeps the doctor away" is a common English-language proverb that appeared in the 19th century, advocating for the daily consumption of apples. By extension, the broader implication is "if one eats healthful foods, one will remain in good health and will not need to see the doctor often."

== Origin ==
A variant of the proverb, "Eat an apple on going to bed, and you'll keep the doctor from earning his bread" was recorded as a Pembrokeshire saying in 1866. The modern phrasing, "An apple a day keeps the doctor away", began usage at the end of the 19th century, with early print examples found as early as 1887.

== Scientific background ==
A 2013 study using computer modelling compared eating apples with taking a common daily cholesterol-lowering drug to estimate risk of cardiovascular diseases. The computer model estimated that eating an apple a day was generally comparable for people over age 50 years to using a statin drug to reduce low-density lipoprotein cholesterol, concluding that eating an apple a day "is able to match modern medicine and is likely to have fewer side effects," while having similar annual cost.

A 2015 study found apple eaters "were more likely, in the crude analysis, to keep the doctor (and prescription medications) away." When they adjusted for "sociodemographic and health-related characteristics, however, the association was no longer statistically significant". The study also found that people who ate an apple a day used fewer prescription medications.

=== Nutritional content of an apple ===
A USDA-standard medium-size (100 gram) raw apple is 86% water and 14% carbohydrates with negligible content of fat and protein, and supplies 52 calories of food energy. It contains a moderate amount of dietary fiber, but otherwise has a low level of micronutrients.
