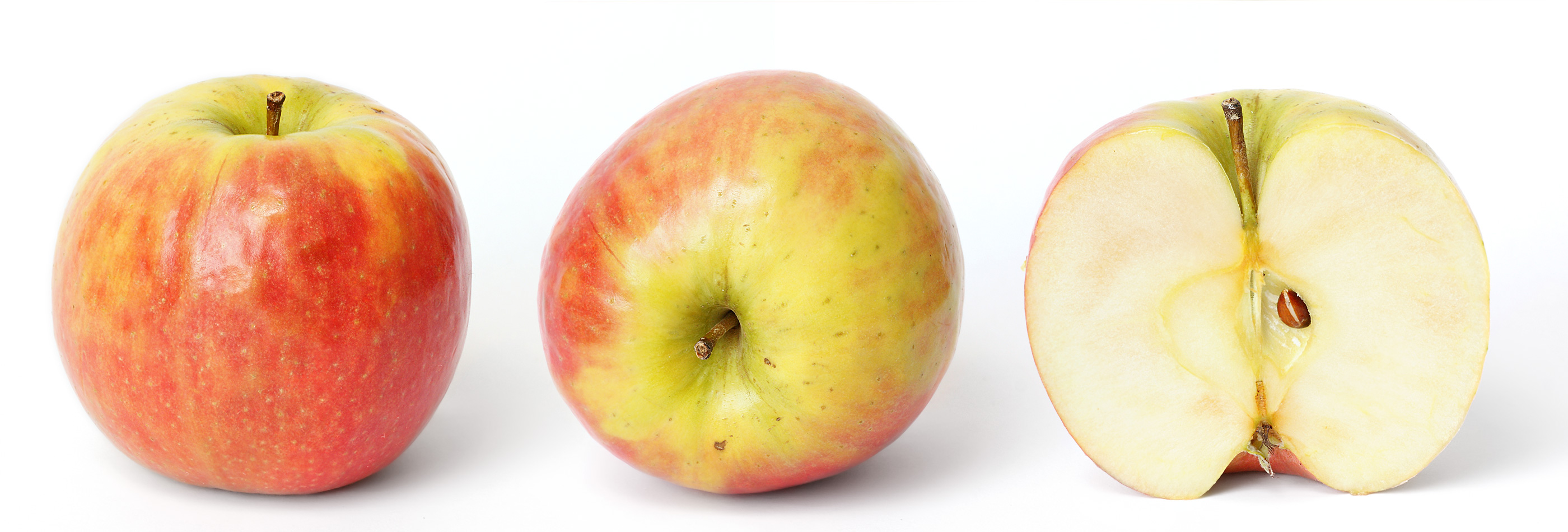
- 'Cripps Pink' cultivar
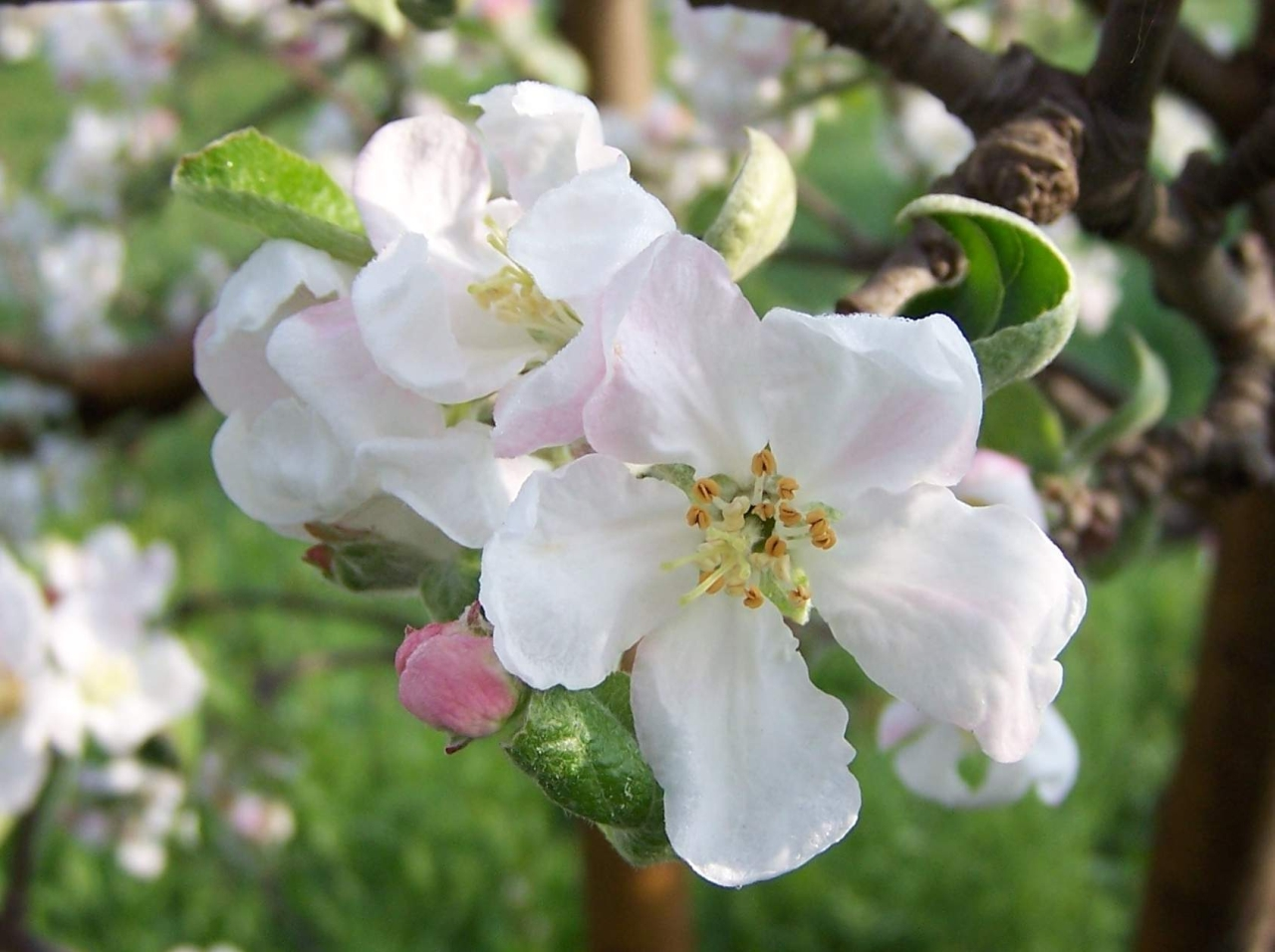
- Flowers of M. domestica

Scientific classification
- Kingdom: Plantae
- Clade: Tracheophytes
- Clade: Angiosperms
- Clade: Eudicots
- Clade: Rosids
- Order: Rosales
- Family: Rosaceae
- Genus: Malus
- Species: M. domestica

Binomial name
- Malus domestica (Suckow) Borkh., 1803

Synonyms
- M. communis Desf., 1768; M. pumila Mil.; M. frutescens Medik.; M. paradisiaca (L.) Medikus; M. sylvestris Mil.; Pyrus malus L.; Pyrus malus var. paradisiaca L.; Pyrus dioica Moench

= Apple =

Edible fruit

An apple is the round, edible fruit of an apple tree (Malus spp.). Fruit trees of the orchard or domestic apple (Malus domestica), the most widely grown in the genus, are cultivated worldwide. The tree originated in Central Asia, where its wild ancestor, Malus sieversii, is still found. Apples have been grown for thousands of years in Eurasia before they were introduced to the American continent by European colonists. Apples have cultural significance in many mythologies (including Norse and Greek) and religions (such as Christianity in Europe).

Apples grown from seeds tend to be very different from those of their parents, and the resultant fruit frequently lacks desired characteristics. For commercial purposes, including botanical evaluation, apple cultivars are propagated by clonal grafting onto rootstocks. Apple trees grown without rootstocks tend to be larger and much slower to fruit after planting. Rootstocks are used to control the speed of growth and the size of the resulting tree, allowing for easier harvesting.

There are more than 7,500 cultivars of apples. Different cultivars are bred for various tastes and uses, including cooking, eating raw, and cider or apple juice production. Trees and fruit are prone to fungal, bacterial, and pest problems, which can be controlled by a number of organic and non-organic means. In 2010, the fruit's genome was sequenced as part of research on disease control and selective breeding in apple production.

== Etymology ==
The word apple is derived from Old English æppel, meaning "fruit", not specifically the apple. That in turn is descended from the Proto-Germanic noun *aplaz, descended in turn from Proto-Indo-European *h₂ébōl. As late as the 17th century, the word also functioned as a generic term for all fruit including nuts; one example is the pineapple, the swollen accessory fruit outside of the cashew nut known as the "cashew apple", another is a 14th-century Middle English expression appel of paradis, meaning a banana.

== Description ==
The apple tree is deciduous, generally standing from 2 to 4.5 metres (6 to 15 feet) tall in cultivation and up to 15 m (49 ft) in the wild, though more typically 2 to 10 m (6.5 to 33 ft). When cultivated, the size, shape and branch density are determined by rootstock selection and trimming method. Apple trees may naturally have a rounded to erect crown with a dense canopy of leaves. The bark of the trunk is dark gray or gray-brown, but young branches are reddish or dark-brown with a smooth texture. Young twigs are covered in fine downy hairs; they become hairless when older.

The buds are egg-shaped and dark red or purple in color; they range in size from 3 to 5mm, but are usually less than 4mm. The bud scales have very hairy edges. When emerging from the buds, the leaves are convolute, meaning that their edges overlap each other. Leaves can be simple ovals (elliptic), medium or wide in width, somewhat egg-shaped with the wider portion toward their base (ovate), or even with sides that are more parallel to each other instead of curved (oblong) with a narrow pointed end. The edges have broadly-angled teeth, but do not have lobes. The top surface of the leaves are glabrescent, almost hairless, while the undersides are densely covered in fine hairs. The leaves are attached alternately by short leaf stems 1-to-3.5 cm (1/2-to-1 1/2 in) long.

Blossoms are produced in spring simultaneously with the budding of the leaves and are produced on spurs and some long shoots. When the flower buds first begin to open the petals are rose-pink and fade to white or light pink when fully open with each flower 3 to 4 centimeters (1 to 1 1/2 inches) in diameter. The five-petaled flowers are group in an inflorescence consisting of a cyme with 3–7 flowers. The central flower of the inflorescence is called the "king bloom"; it opens first and can develop a larger fruit. Open apple blossoms are damaged by even brief exposures to temperatures −2 °C (28 °F) or less, although the overwintering wood and buds are hardy down to −40 °C (−40 °F).

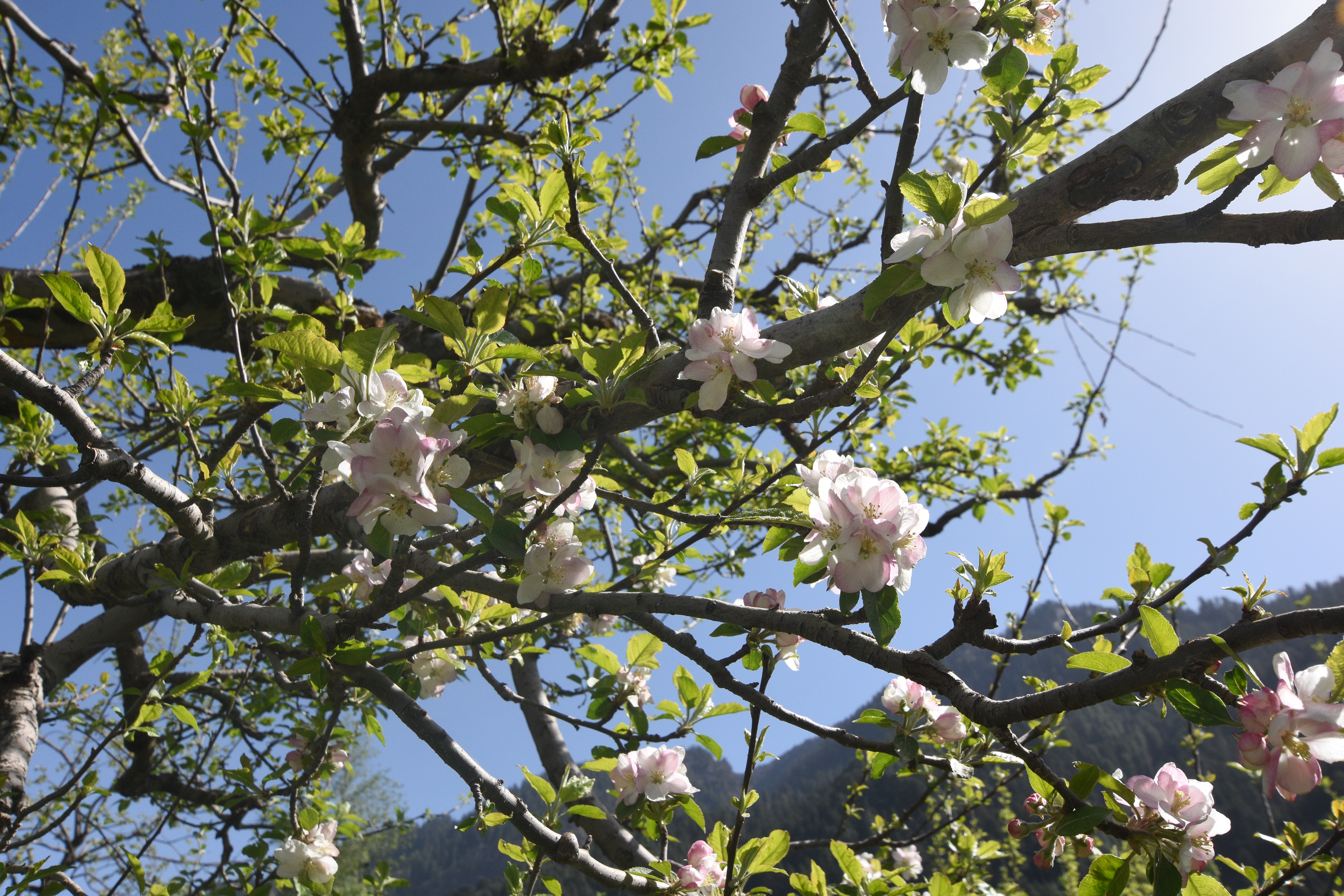
Apple blossoms

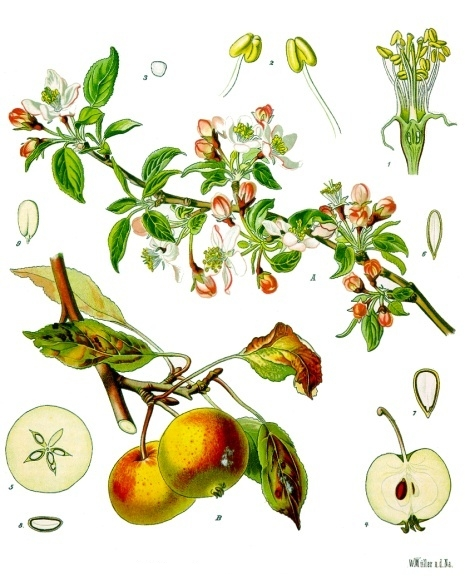
Botanical illustration

=== Fruit ===
The fruit is a pome that matures in late summer or autumn. The true fruits or carpels are the harder interior chambers inside the apple's core. There are usually five carpels inside an apple, but there may be as few as three. Each of the chambers contains one or two seeds. The edible flesh is formed from the receptacle at the base of the flower.

How apple fruit derives from flower structures

The seeds are egg- to pear-shaped and may be colored from light brown or tan to a very dark brown, often with red shades or even purplish-black. They may have a blunt or sharp point. The five sepals remain attached and stand out from the surface of the apple.

The size of the fruit varies widely between cultivars, but generally has a diameter between 2.5 and 12 cm (1 and 5 in). The shape is quite variable and may be nearly round, elongated, conical, or short and wide.

The groundcolor of ripe apples is yellow, green, yellow-green or whitish yellow. The overcolor of ripe apples can be orange-red, pink-red, red, purple-red or brown-red. The overcolor amount can be 0–100%. The skin may be wholly or partly russeted, making it rough and brown. The skin is covered in a protective layer of epicuticular wax. The skin may be marked with scattered dots. The flesh is generally pale yellowish-white, though it can be pink, yellow or green, and rarely black, purple or pearl.

Apples can have any amount of overcolor, a darker tint over a pale groundcolor.
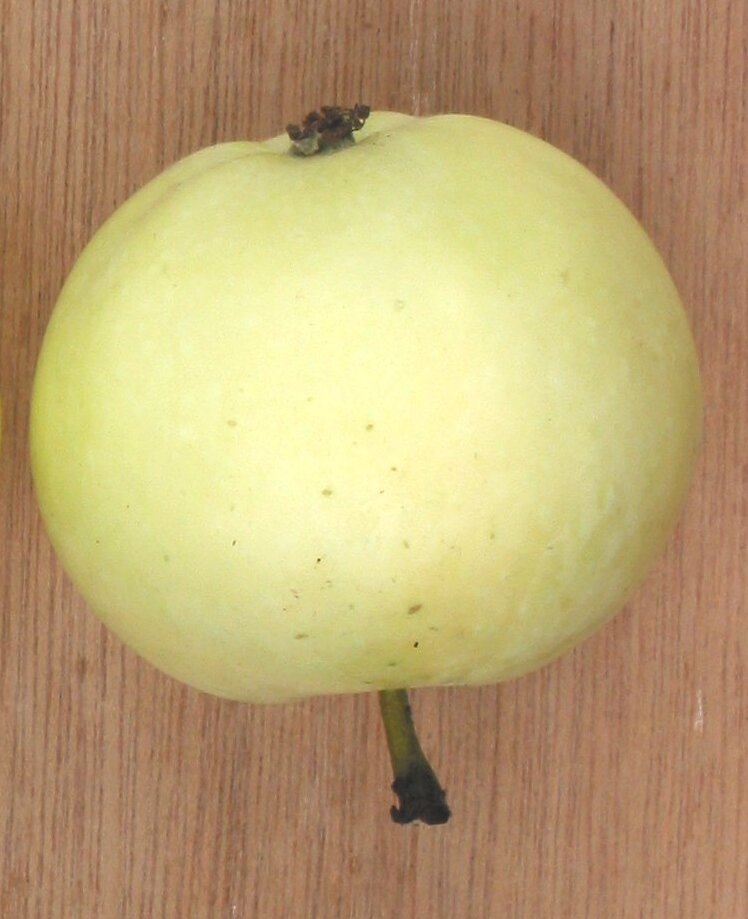
0% overcolor

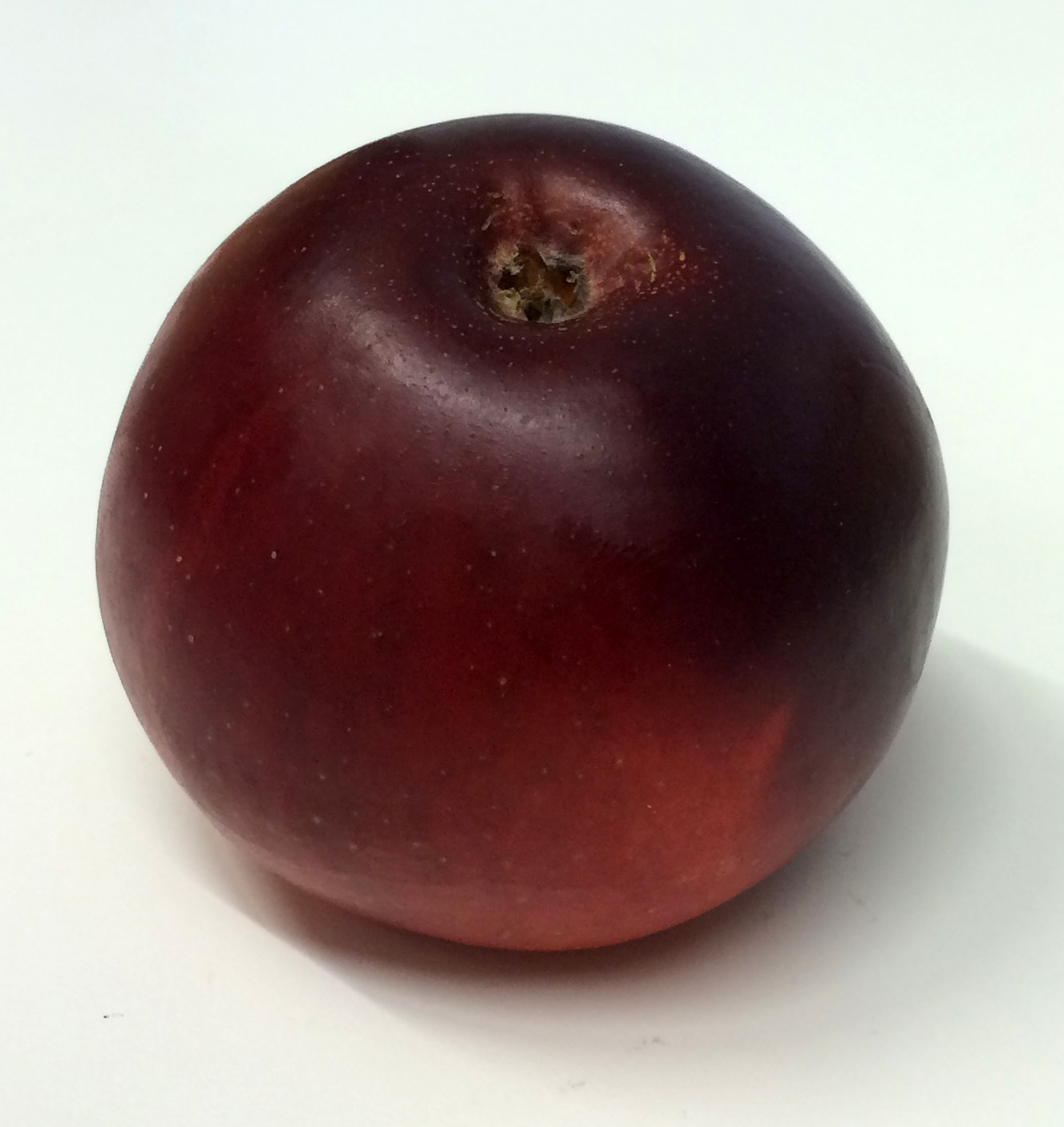
100% overcolor

=== Chemistry ===
Important volatile compounds in apples that contribute to their scent and flavour include acetaldehyde, ethyl acetate, 1-butanal, ethanol, 2-methylbutanal, 3-methylbutanal, ethyl propionate, ethyl 2-methylpropionate, ethyl butyrate, ethyl 2-methyl butyrate, hexanal, 1-butanol, 3-methylbutyl acetate, 2-methylbutyl acetate, 1-propyl butyrate, ethyl pentanoate, amyl acetate, 2-methyl-1-butanol, trans-2-hexenal, ethyl hexanoate, hexanol.

== Taxonomy ==
The apple as a species has more than 100 alternative scientific names, or synonyms. In modern times, Malus pumila and Malus domestica are the two main names in use. M. pumila is the older name, but M. domestica has become much more commonly used starting in the 21st century, especially in the western world. Two proposals were made to make M. domestica a conserved name: the earlier proposal was voted down by the Committee for Vascular Plants of the IAPT in 2014, but in April 2017 the Committee decided, with a narrow majority, that the newly popular name should be conserved. The General Committee of the IAPT decided in June 2017 to approve this change, officially conserving M. domestica. Nevertheless, some works published after 2017 still use M. pumila as the correct name, under an alternate taxonomy.

When first classified by Linnaeus in 1753, the pears, apples, and quinces were combined into one genus that he named Pyrus and he named the apple as Pyrus malus. This was widely accepted. However, the botanist Philip Miller published an alternate classification in The Gardeners Dictionary, with the apple species separated from Pyrus, in 1754. He did not clearly indicate that by Malus pumila he meant the domesticated apple; nonetheless, the term was used as such by many botanists. When Moritz Balthasar Borkhausen published his scientific description of the apple in 1803 it may have been a new combination of P. malus var. domestica, but this was not directly referenced by Borkhausen. The earliest use of var. domestica for the apple was by Georg Adolf Suckow in 1786.

=== Genome ===
Apples are diploid, with two sets of chromosomes per cell (though triploid cultivars, with three sets, are not uncommon), have 17 chromosomes and an estimated genome size of approximately 650 Mb. Several whole genome sequences have been completed and made available. The first one in 2010 was based on the diploid cultivar 'Golden Delicious'. However, this first whole genome sequence contained several errors, in part owing to the high degree of heterozygosity in diploid apples which, in combination with an ancient genome duplication, complicated the assembly. Recently, double- and trihaploid individuals have been sequenced, yielding whole genome sequences of higher quality.

The first whole genome assembly was estimated to contain around 57,000 genes, though the more recent genome sequences support estimates between 42,000 and 44,700 protein-coding genes. The availability of whole genome sequences has provided evidence that the wild ancestor of the cultivated apple most likely is Malus sieversii. Re-sequencing of multiple accessions has supported this, while also suggesting extensive introgression from Malus sylvestris following domestication.

== Cultivation ==
=== History ===
Map of the origins of the cultivated apple. The wild origin is in Kazakhstan; hybridisations and repeated domestications followed, modifying many attributes of the fruit.

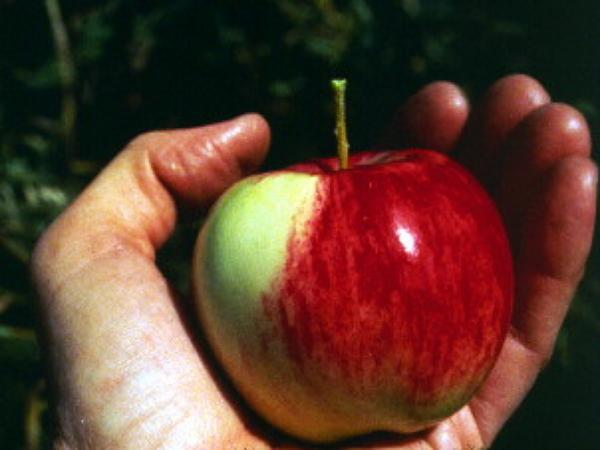
Wild Malus sieversii apple in Kazakhstan

Central Asia is generally considered the center of origin for apples due to the genetic variability in specimens there. The wild ancestor of Malus domestica was Malus sieversii, found growing wild in the mountains of Central Asia in southern Kazakhstan, Kyrgyzstan, Tajikistan, and northwestern China. Cultivation of the species, most likely beginning on the forested flanks of the Tian Shan mountains, progressed over a long period of time and permitted secondary introgression of genes from other species into the open-pollinated seeds. Significant exchange with Malus sylvestris, the crabapple, resulted in populations of apples being more related to crabapples than to the more morphologically similar progenitor Malus sieversii. In strains without recent admixture the contribution of the latter predominates.

The apple is thought to have been domesticated 4,000–10,000 years ago in the Tian Shan mountains, and then to have travelled along the Silk Road to Europe, with hybridisation and introgression of wild crabapples from Siberia (M. baccata), the Caucasus (M. orientalis), and Europe (M. sylvestris). Only the M. sieversii trees growing on the western side of the Tian Shan mountains contributed genetically to the domesticated apple, not the isolated population on the eastern side.

Chinese soft apples, such as M. asiatica and M. prunifolia, have been cultivated as dessert apples for more than 2,000 years in China. These are thought to be hybrids between M. baccata and M. sieversii in Kazakhstan.

Among the traits selected for by human growers are size, fruit acidity, color, firmness, and soluble sugar. Unusually for domesticated fruits, the wild M. sieversii origin is only slightly smaller than the modern domesticated apple.

At the Sammardenchia-Cueis site near Udine in Northeastern Italy, seeds from some form of apples have been found in material carbon dated to between 6570 and 5684 BCE. Genetic analysis has not yet been successfully used to determine whether such ancient apples were wild Malus sylvestris or Malus domesticus containing Malus sieversii ancestry. It is hard to distinguish in the archeological record between foraged wild apples and apple plantations.

There is indirect evidence of apple cultivation in the third millennium BCE in the Middle East. There is direct evidence, apple cores, dated to the 10th century BCE from a Judean site between the Sinai and Negev. There was substantial apple production in European classical antiquity, and grafting was certainly known then. Grafting is an essential part of modern domesticated apple production, to be able to propagate the best cultivars; it is unclear when apple tree grafting was invented.

"Wild Apples"
by Henry David Thoreau
Read by Kevin S for LibriVox
Audio 01:01:35 (full text)

The Roman writer Pliny the Elder describes a method of storage for apples from his time in the 1st century. He says they should be placed in a room with good air circulation from a north facing window on a bed of straw, chaff, or mats with windfalls kept separately. These methods extend the shelf life of fresh apples, but refrigeration is still required. Even sturdy winter varieties only keep well until December in cool climates. For longer storage medieval Europeans strung up cored and peeled apples to dry, either whole or sliced into rings.

Of the many Old World plants that the Spanish introduced to Chiloé Archipelago in the 16th century, apple trees became particularly well adapted. Apples were introduced to North America by colonists in the 17th century, and the first named apple cultivar was introduced in Boston by Reverend William Blaxton in 1640. The only apples native to North America are crab apples.

Apple cultivars brought as seed from Europe were spread along Native American trade routes, as well as being cultivated on colonial farms. An 1845 United States apples nursery catalogue sold 350 of the "best" cultivars, showing the proliferation of new North American cultivars by the early 19th century. In the 20th century, irrigation projects in Eastern Washington began and allowed the development of the multibillion-dollar fruit industry, of which the apple is the leading product.

Until the 20th century, farmers stored apples in frostproof cellars during the winter for their own use or for sale. Improved transportation of fresh apples by train and road replaced the necessity for storage. Controlled atmosphere facilities are used to keep apples fresh year-round. Controlled atmosphere facilities use high humidity, low oxygen, and controlled carbon dioxide levels to maintain fruit freshness. They were first researched at Cambridge University in the 1920s and first used in the United States in the 1950s.

=== Breeding ===
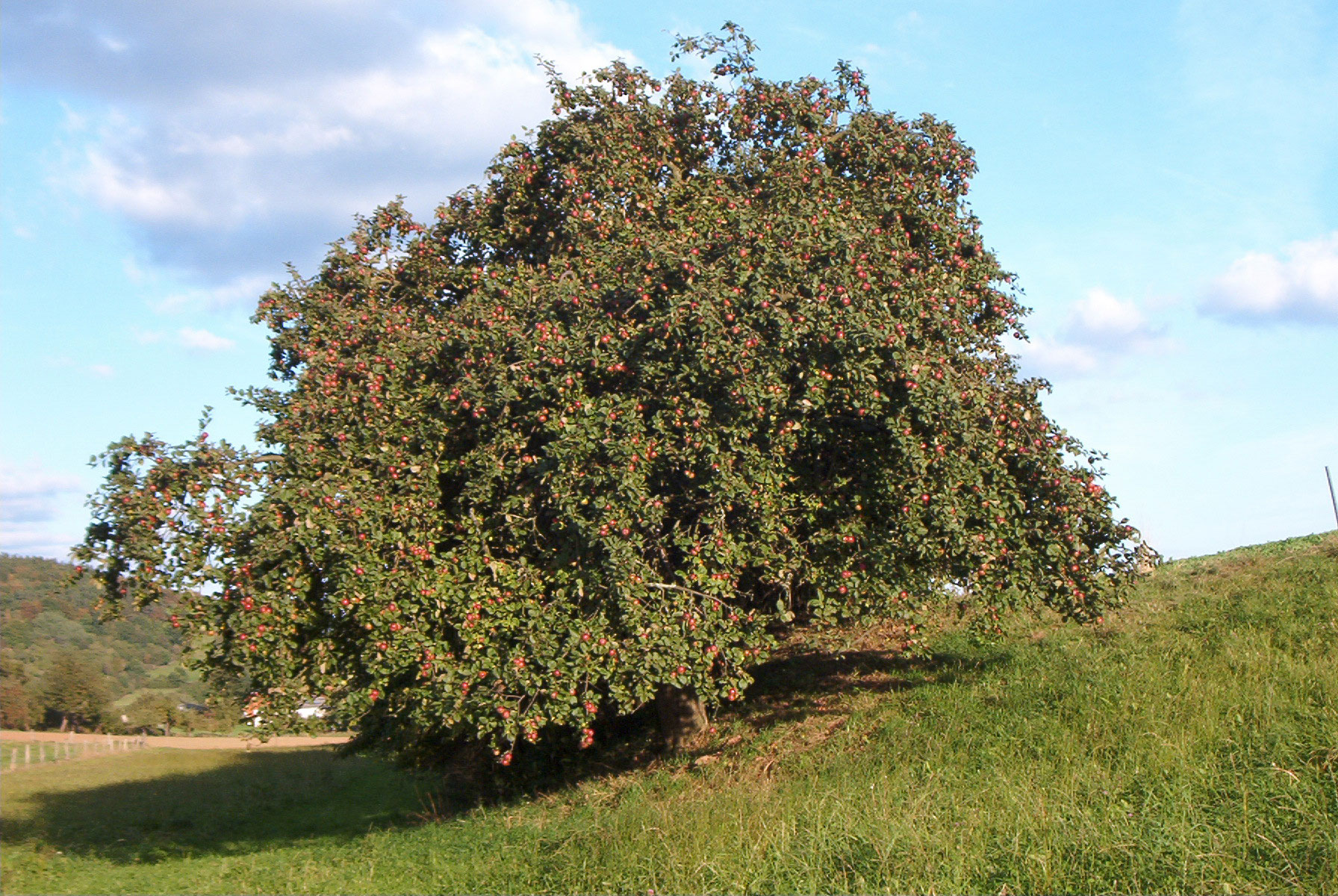
An apple tree in Germany

Many apples grow readily from seeds. However, apples must be propagated asexually to obtain cuttings with the characteristics of the parent. This is because seedling apples do not "breed true", instead they are "extreme heterozygotes", i.e. rather than resembling their parents, seedlings are all different from each other and from their parents. Triploid cultivars have an additional reproductive barrier in that three sets of chromosomes cannot be divided evenly during meiosis, yielding unequal segregation of the chromosomes (aneuploids). Even in the case when a triploid plant can produce a seed (apples are an example), it occurs infrequently, and seedlings rarely survive.

Because apples are not true breeders when planted as seeds, propagation usually involves grafting of cuttings. The rootstock used for the bottom of the graft can be selected to produce trees of a large variety of sizes, as well as changing the winter hardiness, insect and disease resistance, and soil preference of the resulting tree. Dwarf rootstocks can be used to produce very small trees (less than 3.0 m or 10 ft high at maturity), which bear fruit many years earlier in their life cycle than full size trees, and are easier to harvest.

Dwarf rootstocks for apple trees can be traced as far back as 300 BCE, to the area of Persia and Asia Minor. Alexander the Great sent samples of dwarf apple trees to Aristotle's Lyceum. Dwarf rootstocks became common by the 15th century and later went through several cycles of popularity and decline throughout the world. The majority of the rootstocks used to control size in apples were developed in England in the early 1900s. The East Malling Research Station conducted extensive research into rootstocks, and their rootstocks are given an "M" prefix to designate their origin. Rootstocks marked with an "MM" prefix are Malling-series cultivars later crossed with trees of 'Northern Spy' in Merton, England.

Most new apple cultivars originate as seedlings, which either arise by chance or are bred by deliberately crossing cultivars with promising characteristics. The words "seedling", "pippin", and "kernel" in the name of an apple cultivar suggest that it originated as a seedling. Apples can also form bud sports (mutations on a single branch). Some bud sports turn out to be improved strains of the parent cultivar. Some differ sufficiently from the parent tree to be considered new cultivars.

Apples have been acclimatized in Ecuador at very high altitudes, where they can often, with the needed factors, provide crops twice per year because of constant temperate conditions year-round.

=== Pollination ===
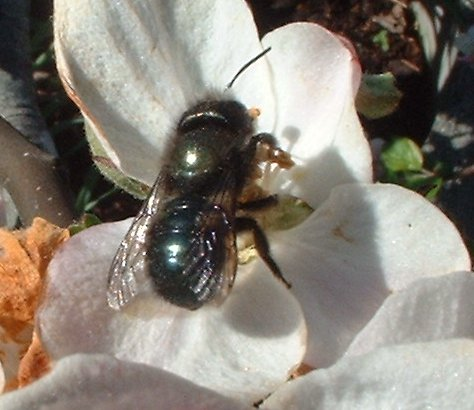
An orchard mason bee on an apple bloom

Apples are self-incompatible; they must cross-pollinate to develop fruit. During the flowering each season, apple growers often utilize pollinators to carry pollen. Honey bees are most commonly used. Orchard mason bees are also used as supplemental pollinators in commercial orchards. Bumblebee queens are sometimes present in orchards, but not usually in sufficient number to be significant pollinators.

Cultivars are sometimes classified by the day of peak bloom in the average 30-day blossom period, with pollinizers selected from cultivars within a 6-day overlap period. There are four to seven pollination groups in apples, depending on climate:

- Group A – Early flowering, 1 to 3 May in England ('Gravenstein', 'Red Astrachan')
- Group B – 4 to 7 May ('Idared', 'McIntosh')
- Group C – Mid-season flowering, 8 to 11 May ('Granny Smith', 'Cox's Orange Pippin')
- Group D – Mid/late season flowering, 12 to 15 May ('Golden Delicious', 'Calville blanc d'hiver')
- Group E – Late flowering, 16 to 18 May ('Braeburn', 'Reinette d'Orléans')
- Group F – 19 to 23 May ('Suntan')
- Group H – 24 to 28 May ('Court-Pendu Gris', Court-Pendu plat)

One cultivar can be pollinated by a compatible cultivar from the same group or close (A with A, or A with B, but not A with C or D).

=== Maturation and harvest ===
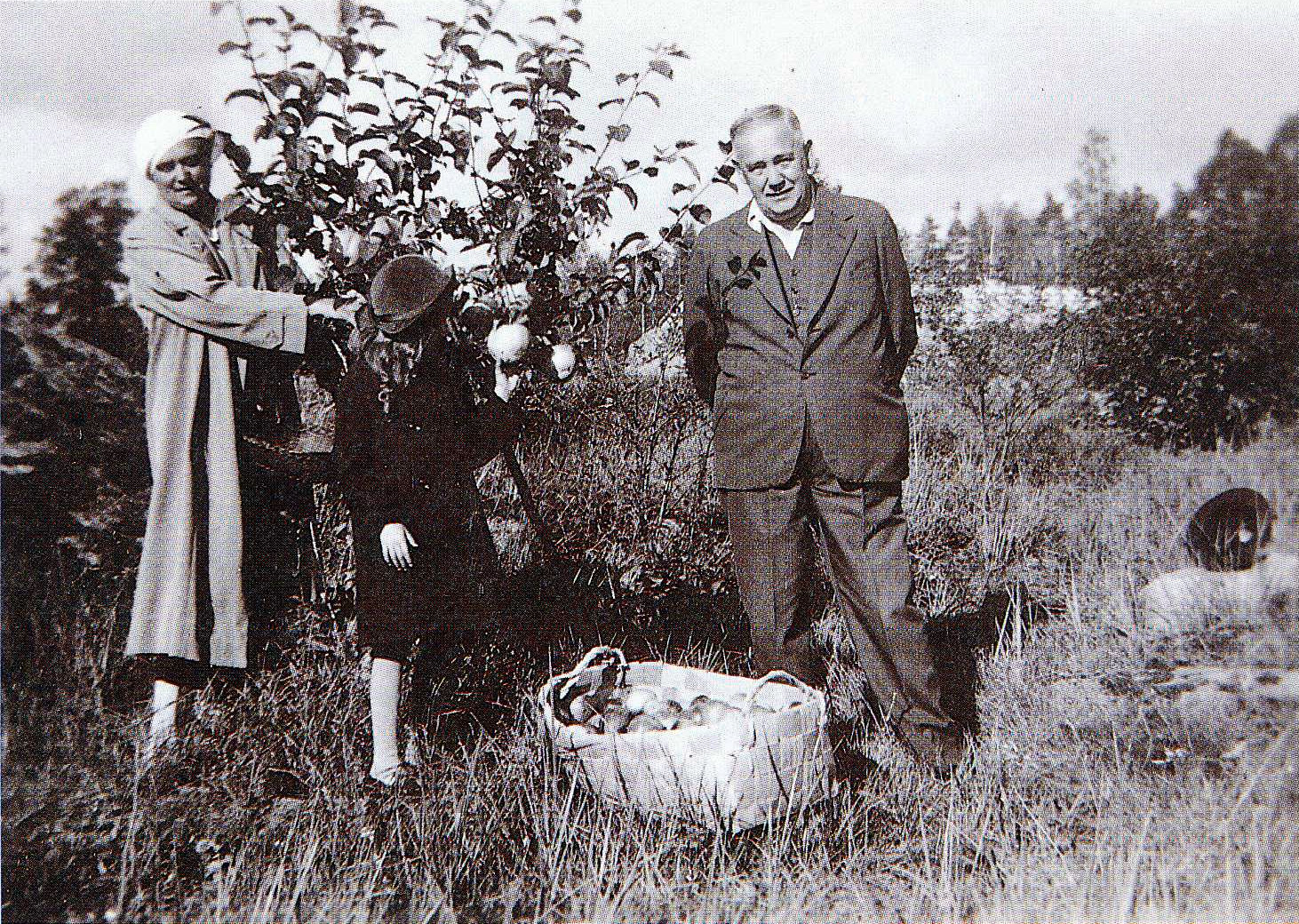
Lauri Kristian Relander, the former President of Finland, with his family picking apples in the 1930s

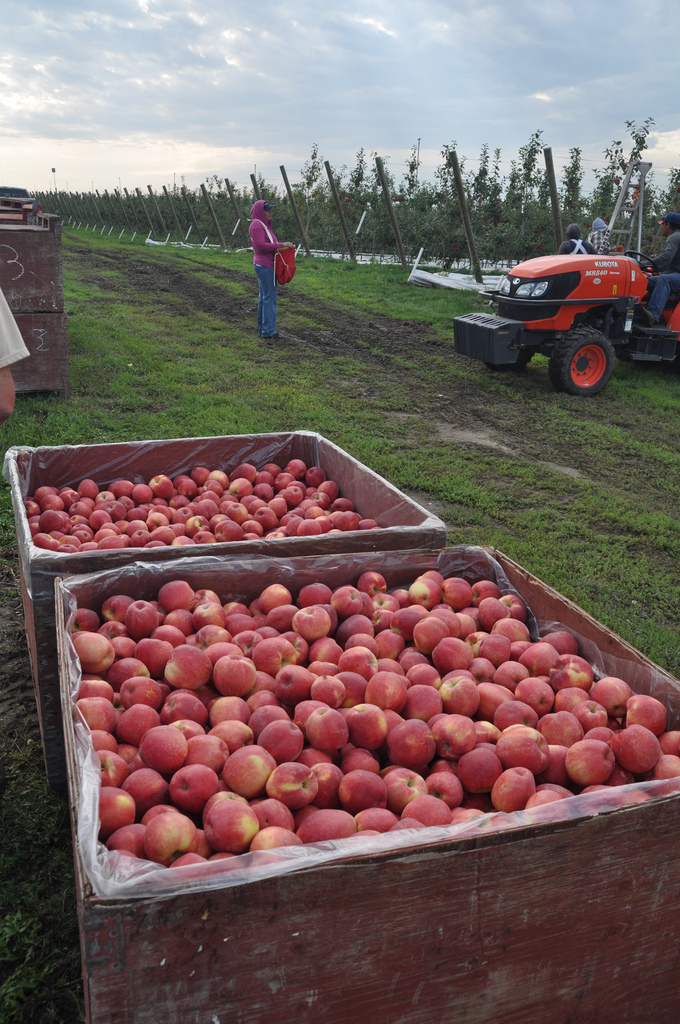
A US apple harvest, 2010

Cultivars vary in their yield and the ultimate size of the tree, even when grown on the same rootstock. Some cultivars, if left unpruned, grow very large—letting them bear more fruit, but making harvesting more difficult. Depending on tree density (number of trees planted per unit surface area), mature trees typically bear 40–200 kg (90–440 lb) of apples each year, though productivity can be close to zero in poor years. Apples are harvested using three-point ladders that are designed to fit amongst the branches. Trees grafted on dwarfing rootstocks bear about 10–80 kg (20–180 lb) of fruit per year.

Some farms with apple orchards open them to the public so consumers can pick their own apples.

Crops ripen at different times of the year according to the cultivar. Cultivars that yield their crop in the summer include 'Sweet Bough' and 'Duchess'; fall producers include 'Blenheim'; winter producers include 'King', 'Swayzie', and 'Tolman Sweet'.

=== Storage ===
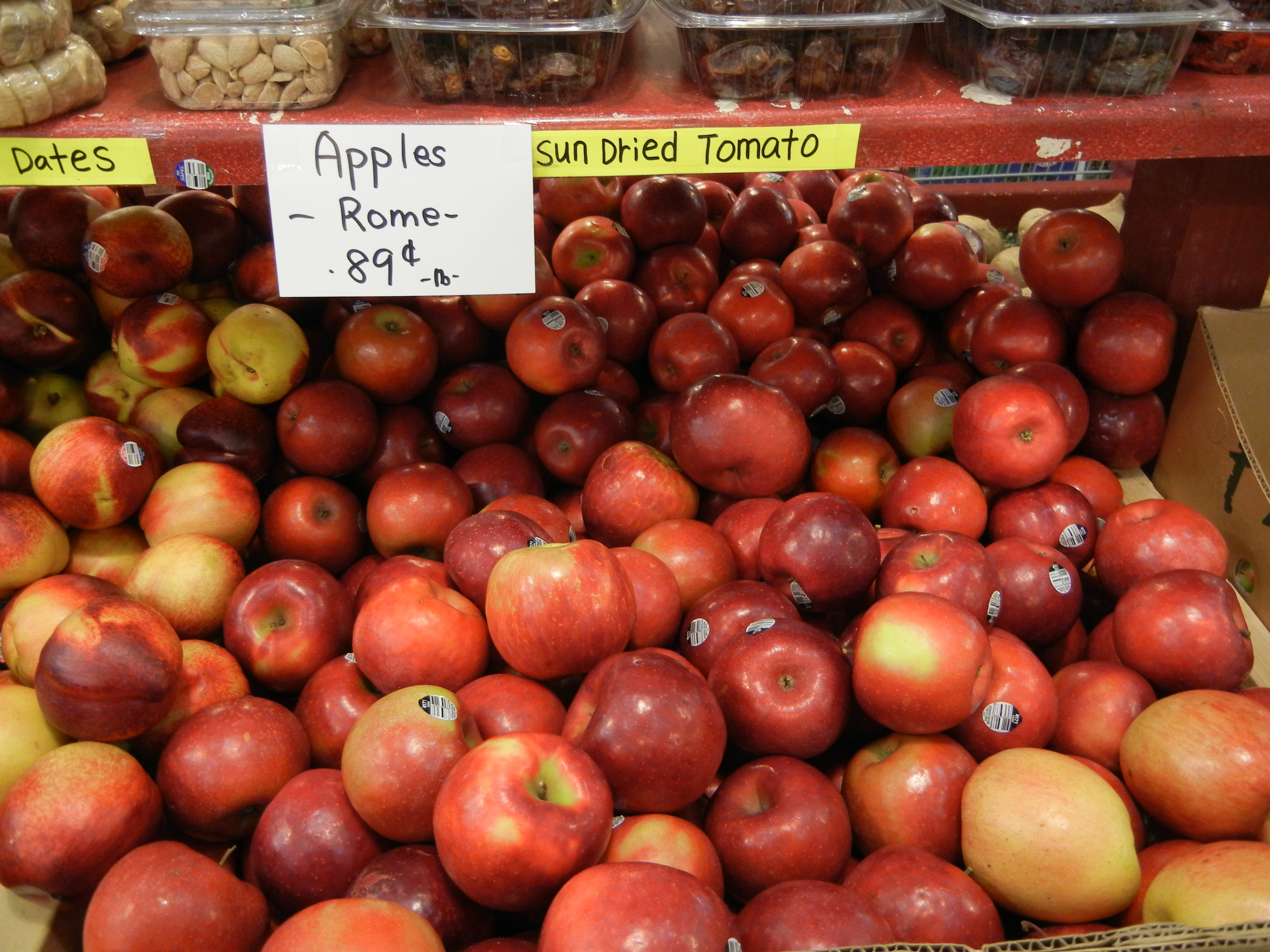
Rome apples on sale at a farmer's market

Commercially, apples can be stored for months in controlled atmosphere chambers. Apples are commonly stored in chambers with lowered concentrations of oxygen to reduce respiration and slow softening and other changes if the fruit is already fully ripe. The gas ethylene is used by plants as a hormone which promotes ripening, decreasing the time an apple can be stored. For storage longer than about six months the apples are picked earlier, before full ripeness, when ethylene production by the fruit is low. However, in many varieties this increases their sensitivity to carbon dioxide, which also must be controlled.

For home storage, most cultivars of apple can be stored for three weeks in a pantry and four to six weeks from the date of purchase in a refrigerator that maintains 4 to 0 °C (39 to 32 °F). Some varieties of apples (e.g. 'Granny Smith' and 'Fuji') have more than three times the storage life of others.

Non-organic apples may be sprayed with a substance 1-methylcyclopropene blocking the apples' ethylene receptors, temporarily preventing them from ripening.

=== Pests and diseases ===
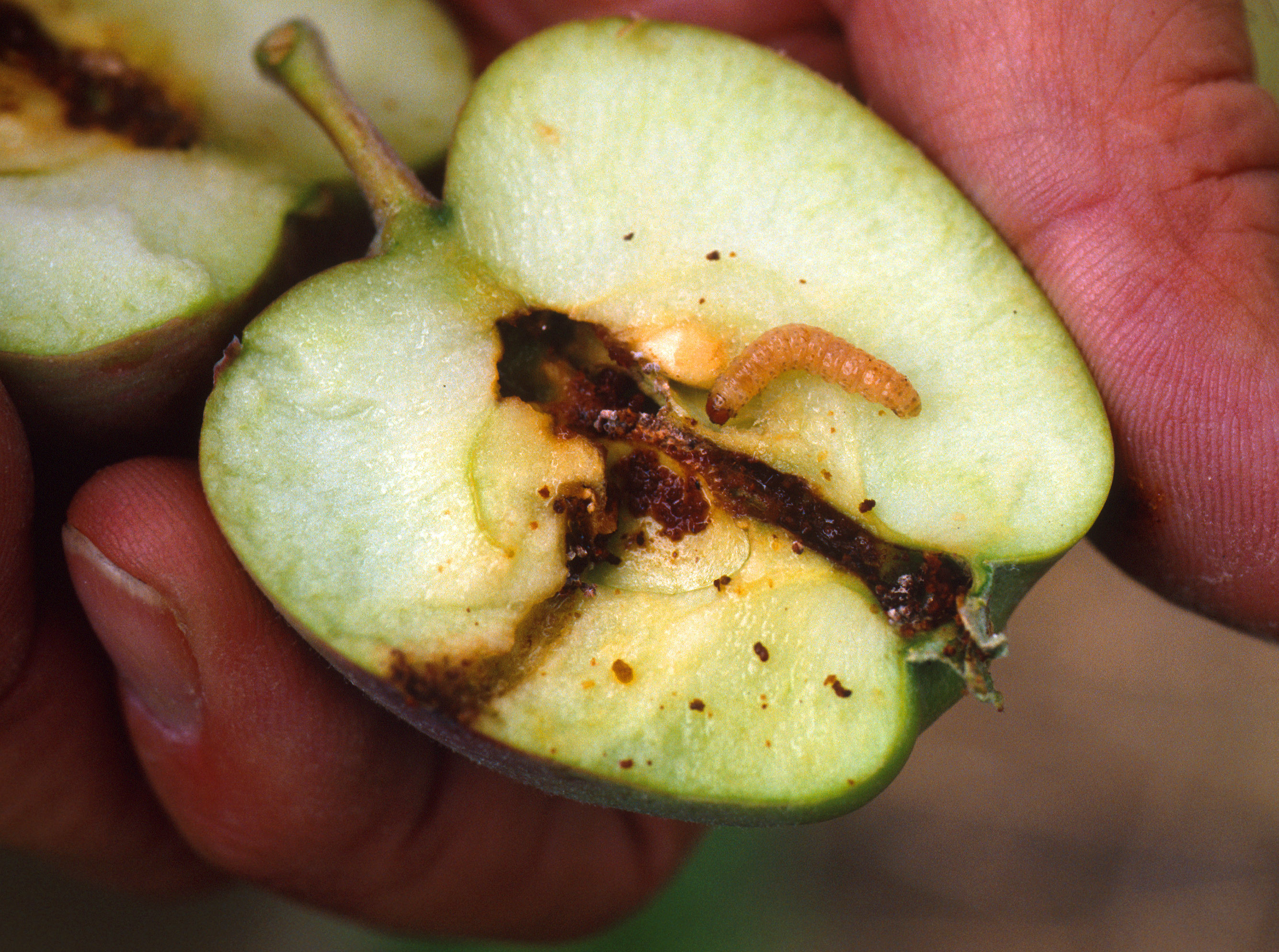
Codling moth larva tunnelling inside an apple

A wide range of pests and diseases can affect the plant, including:

- Mildew is characterized by light grey powdery patches appearing on the leaves, shoots and flowers, normally in spring. The flowers turn a creamy yellow color and do not develop correctly. This can be treated similarly to Botrytis—eliminating the conditions that caused the disease and burning the infected plants are among recommended actions.
- Aphids are small insects with sucking mouthparts. Five species of aphids commonly attack apples: apple grain aphid, rosy apple aphid, apple aphid, spirea aphid, and the woolly apple aphid. The aphid species can be identified by color, time of year, and by differences in the cornicles (small paired projections from their rear). Aphids feed on foliage using needle-like mouth parts to suck out plant juices. When present in high numbers, certain species reduce tree growth and vigor.
- Apple scab: Apple scab causes leaves to develop olive-brown spots with a velvety texture that later turn brown and become cork-like in texture. The disease also affects the fruit, which also develops similar brown spots with velvety or cork-like textures. Apple scab is spread through fungus growing in old apple leaves on the ground and spreads during warm spring weather to infect the new year's growth.

Among the most serious disease problems is a bacterial disease called fireblight, and three fungal diseases: Gymnosporangium rust, black spot, and bitter rot. Codling moths, and the apple maggots of fruit flies, cause serious damage to apple fruits, making them unsaleable. Young apple trees are also prone to mammal pests like mice and deer, which feed on the soft bark of the trees, especially in winter. The larvae of the apple clearwing moth (red-belted clearwing) burrow through the bark and into the phloem of apple trees, potentially causing significant damage.

=== Cultivars ===
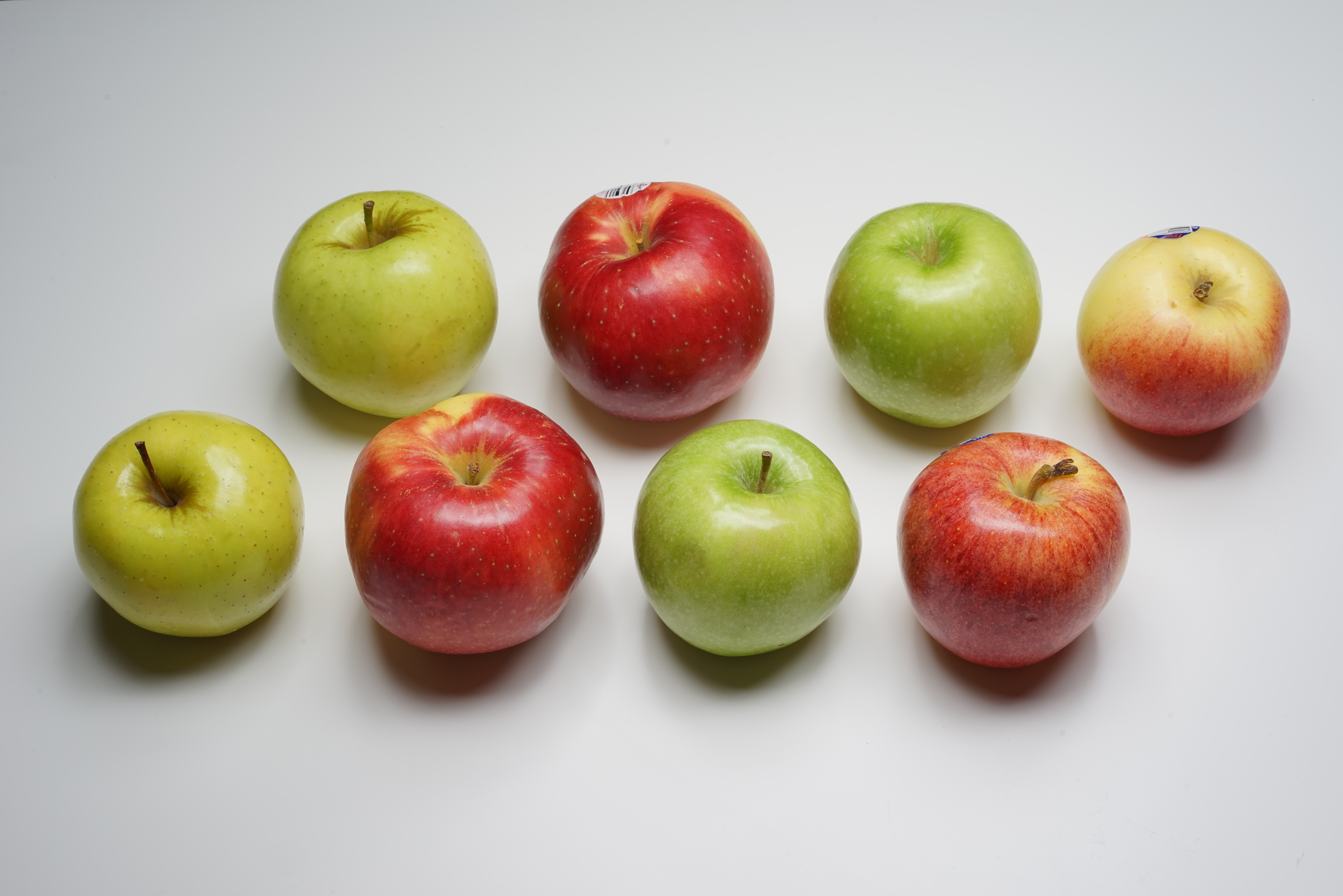
From left to right: the 'Golden Delicious', 'SweeTango', 'Granny Smith', and 'Gala' apples

There are more than 7,500 known cultivars (cultivated varieties) of apples. Cultivars vary in their yield and the ultimate size of the tree, even when grown on the same rootstock. Different cultivars are available for temperate and subtropical climates. The UK's National Fruit Collection in Kent includes over 2,000 apple cultivars. The University of Reading, responsible for developing the UK national collection database, provides access to search the national collection. Its work is part of the European Cooperative Programme for Plant Genetic Resources, with 38 countries participating in the Malus/Pyrus work group.

The UK's national fruit collection database contains much information on the characteristics and origin of many apples, including alternative names for what is essentially the same "genetic" apple cultivar. Most of these cultivars are bred for eating fresh (dessert apples), though some are cultivated specifically for cooking (cooking apples) or producing cider. Cider apples are typically too tart and astringent to eat fresh, but they give the beverage a rich flavor that dessert apples cannot.

In Europe, apple breeding programs are conducted at places such as Julius Kühn-Institut, the German federal research center for cultivated plants.

In the United States there are many apple breeding programs associated with universities. For instance, in the East, Cornell University has had a program operating since 1880 in Geneva, New York, while in the West, Washington State University started a program to support their home state's apple industry in 1994. Released by the University of Minnesota in 1991, the 'Honeycrisp' has become famous for its crispness and juiciness, thereby commanding high market prices. Unusually for a popular cultivar, the 'Honeycrisp' is not directly related to another popular apple cultivar but instead to two unsuccessful cultivars. However, it is also difficult to grow and to store, prompting the industry to seek hybrids that not only appeal to consumers but are also less costly for farmers to cultivate and last longer in storage. By the 2020s, about half of the new apple varieties entering the market in the United States and Canada are 'Honeycrisp' progeny. Such hybrids include the 'SweeTango' (a cross between the 'Honeycrisp' and the 'Zestar') introduced by the University of Minnesota in 2008 and the 'Cosmic Crisp' (the 'Honeycrisp' and the 'Enterprise') released by Washington State University in 2017.

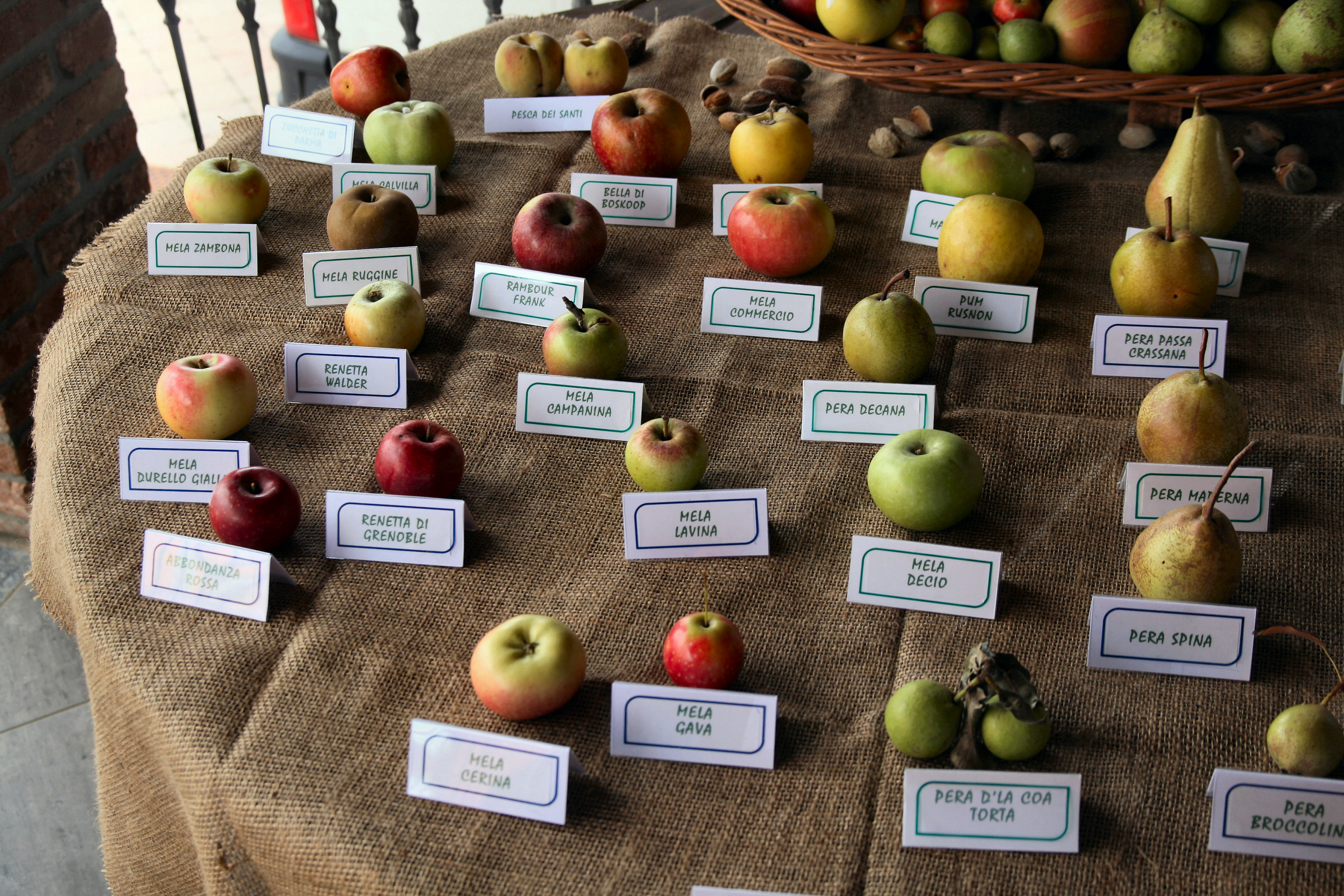
Less common apple cultivars from an orchard in Italy

Commercially popular apple cultivars are soft but crisp. Other desirable qualities in modern commercial apple breeding are a colorful skin, absence of russeting, ease of shipping, lengthy storage ability, high yields, disease resistance, common apple shape, and developed flavor. Modern apples are generally sweeter than older cultivars, as popular tastes in apples have varied over time. Most North Americans and Europeans favor crunchy, sweet, and subacid apples. Nevertheless, tart apples maintain a strong minority following. In the United States today, the most popular apple varieties are the 'Ambrosia', 'Honeycrisp', and 'Jazz', according Nielsen data, while in Canada, the 'Honeycrisp', 'Ambrosia', and 'Gala' take the top spots. Together, these newer varieties have overtaken once dominant cultivars like the 'McIntosh' and the 'Red Delicious' in the North American market. Extremely sweet apples with barely any acid flavor are popular in Asia, especially the Indian subcontinent.

Old cultivars are often oddly shaped, russeted, and grow in a variety of textures and colors. Some find them to have better flavor than modern cultivars, but they may have other problems that make them commercially unviable—low yield, disease susceptibility, poor tolerance for storage or transport, or just being the "wrong" size. A few old cultivars are still produced on a large scale, but many have been preserved by home gardeners and farmers who sell directly to local markets. Many unusual and locally important cultivars with their own unique taste and appearance exist; apple conservation campaigns have sprung up around the world to preserve such local cultivars from extinction. In the United Kingdom, old cultivars such as 'Cox's Orange Pippin' and 'Egremont Russet' are still commercially important even though by modern standards they are low yielding and susceptible to disease.

== Production ==
Apple production 2024, millions of tonnes
| China | 51.2 |
| United States | 4.9 |
| Turkey | 4.4 |
| Poland | 3.4 |
| India | 2.6 |
| Iran | 2.3 |
| World | 97.9 |
Source: FAOSTAT of the United Nations

In 2024, world production of apples was 98 million tonnes, with China producing 52% of the total (table). Secondary producers were the United States, Turkey, and Poland.

Apple production

Apple yield

=== Consumption ===
The biggest per capita consumers in 2023 were Saint Kitts and Nevis (71 kg), Bosnia and Herzegovina (54 kg), the United States (49 kg), and Hungary (38 kg). China consumed 26 kg, and Turkey around 36 kg.

== Toxicity ==
=== Amygdalin ===
Apple seeds contain small amounts of amygdalin, a sugar and cyanide compound known as a cyanogenic glycoside. Ingesting small amounts of apple seeds causes no ill effects, but consumption of extremely large doses can cause adverse reactions. It may take several hours before the poison takes effect, as cyanogenic glycosides must be hydrolyzed before the cyanide ion is released. The U.S. National Library of Medicine's Hazardous Substances Data Bank records no cases of amygdalin poisoning from consuming apple seeds.

=== Allergy ===
One form of apple allergy, often found in northern Europe, is called birch-apple syndrome and is found in people who are also allergic to birch pollen. Allergic reactions are triggered by a protein in apples that is similar to birch pollen, and people affected by this protein can also develop allergies to other fruits, nuts, and vegetables. Reactions, which entail oral allergy syndrome (OAS), generally involve itching and inflammation of the mouth and throat, but in rare cases can also include life-threatening anaphylaxis. This reaction only occurs when raw fruit is consumed—the allergen is neutralized in the cooking process. The variety of apple, maturity and storage conditions can change the amount of allergen present in individual fruits. Long storage times can increase the amount of proteins that cause birch-apple syndrome.

In other areas, such as the Mediterranean, some individuals have adverse reactions to apples because of their similarity to peaches. This form of apple allergy also includes OAS, but often has more severe symptoms, such as vomiting, abdominal pain and urticaria, and can be life-threatening. Individuals with this form of allergy can also develop reactions to other fruits and nuts. Cooking does not break down the protein causing this particular reaction, so affected individuals cannot eat raw or cooked apples. Freshly harvested, over-ripe fruits tend to have the highest levels of the protein that causes this reaction.

Breeding efforts have yet to produce a hypoallergenic fruit suitable for either of the two forms of apple allergy.

== Uses ==
=== Nutrition ===
Apples, with skin (edible parts)
Nutritional value per 100 g (3.5 oz)
- Energy: 218 kJ (52 kcal)
- Carbohydrates: 13.81 g
- Sugars: 10.39
- Dietary fiber: 2.4 g
- Fat: 0.17 g
- Protein: 0.26 g
Vitamins and minerals
| Vitamins | Quantity %DV^{†} |
| Vitamin A equiv. beta-Carotene lutein zeaxanthin | 0% 3 μg 0% 27 μg 29 μg |
| Thiamine (B1) | 1% 0.017 mg |
| Riboflavin (B2) | 2% 0.026 mg |
| Niacin (B3) | 1% 0.091 mg |
| Pantothenic acid (B5) | 1% 0.061 mg |
| Vitamin B6 | 2% 0.041 mg |
| Folate (B9) | 1% 3 μg |
| Vitamin C | 5% 4.6 mg |
| Vitamin E | 1% 0.18 mg |
| Vitamin K | 2% 2.2 μg |
| Minerals | Quantity %DV^{†} |
| Calcium | 0% 6 mg |
| Copper | 3% 0.027 mg |
| Iron | 1% 0.12 mg |
| Magnesium | 1% 5 mg |
| Manganese | 2% 0.035 mg |
| Phosphorus | 1% 11 mg |
| Potassium | 4% 107 mg |
| Sodium | 0% 1 mg |
| Zinc | 0% 0.04 mg |
- Other constituents: Quantity
- Water: 85.56 g
- Link to Full Nutrient Report of USDA FoodData Central
- ^{†}Percentages estimated using US recommendations for adults, except for potassium, which is estimated based on expert recommendation from the National Academies.

A raw apple is 86% water and 14% carbohydrates, with negligible content of fat and protein (table). A reference serving of a raw apple with skin weighing 100 g (3.5 oz) provides 52 calories and a moderate content of dietary fiber (table). Otherwise, there is low content of micronutrients, which are all below 10% of the Daily Value (table).

=== Culinary ===
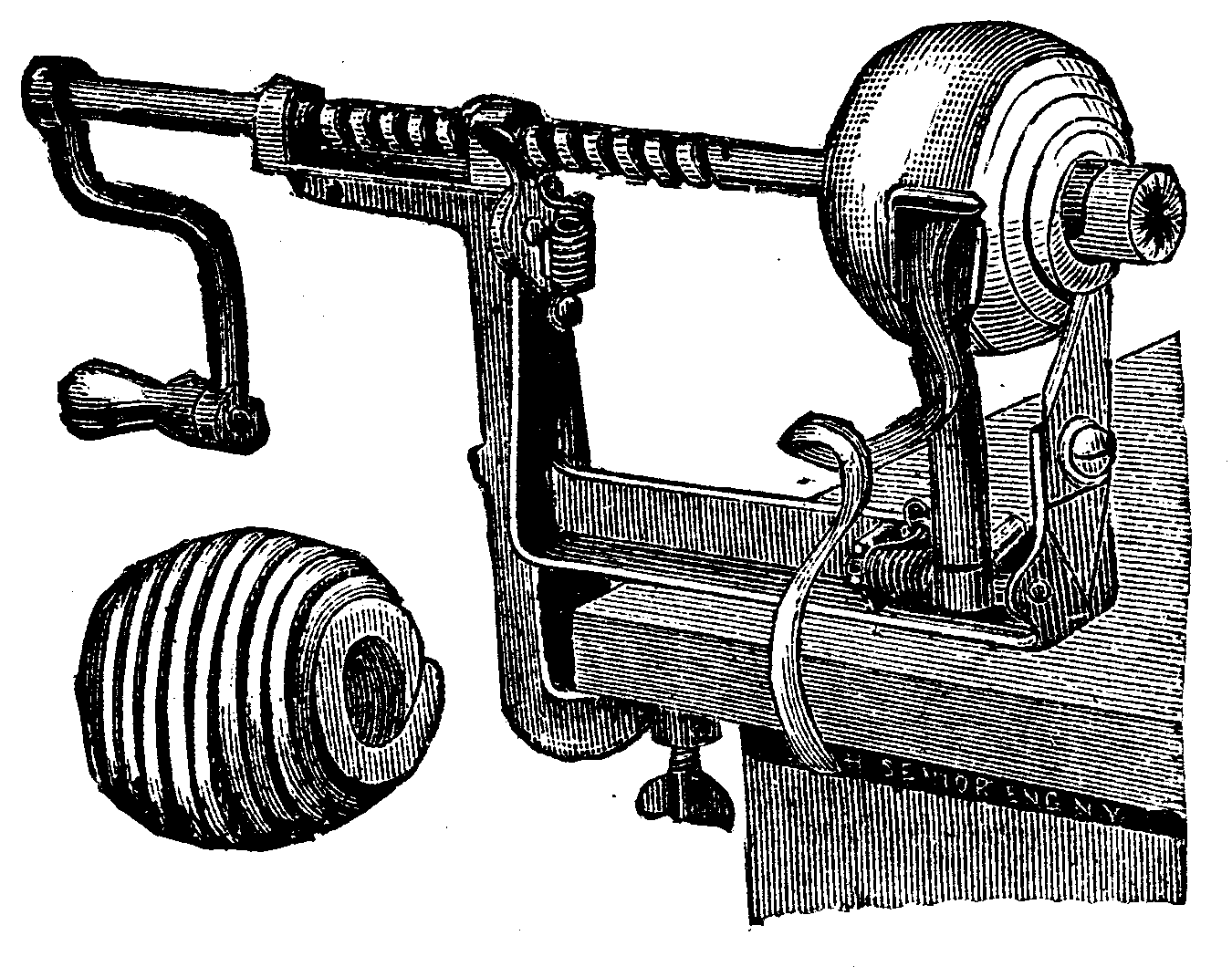
Machine for paring, coring, and slicing apples, from Henry B. Scammell's 1897 handbook Cyclopedia of Valuable Receipts

Apple varieties can be grouped as cooking apples, eating apples, and cider apples, the last so astringent as to be "almost inedible". Apples are consumed as juice, raw in salads, baked in pies, cooked into sauces and apple butter, or baked. They are sometimes used as an ingredient in savory foods, such as sausage and stuffing.

Several techniques are used to preserve apples and apple products. Traditional methods include drying and making apple butter. Juice and cider are produced commercially; cider is a significant industry in regions such as the West of England and Normandy.

A toffee apple (UK) or caramel apple (US) is a confection made by coating an apple in hot toffee or caramel candy respectively and allowing it to cool. Apples and honey are a ritual food pairing eaten during the Jewish New Year of Rosh Hashanah.

Apples are an important ingredient in many desserts, such as pies, crumbles, and cakes. When cooked, some apple cultivars easily form a purée known as apple sauce, which can be cooked down to form a preserve, apple butter. They are often baked or stewed, and are cooked in some meat dishes.

Apples are milled or pressed to produce apple juice, which may be drunk unfiltered (called apple cider in North America), or filtered. Filtered juice is often concentrated and frozen, then reconstituted later and consumed. Apple juice can be fermented to make cider (called hard cider in North America), ciderkin, and vinegar. Through distillation, various alcoholic beverages can be produced, such as applejack, Calvados, and apple brandy.

=== Organic production ===
Organic apples are commonly produced in the United States. Due to infestations by key insects and diseases, organic production is difficult in Europe. The use of pesticides containing chemicals, such as sulfur, copper, microorganisms, viruses, clay powders, or plant extracts (pyrethrum, neem) has been approved by the EU Organic Standing Committee to improve organic yield and quality. A light coating of kaolin, which forms a physical barrier to some pests, also may help prevent apple sun scalding.

=== Non-browning apples ===
Apple skins and seeds contain polyphenols. These are oxidised by the enzyme polyphenol oxidase, which causes browning in sliced or bruised apples, by catalyzing the oxidation of phenolic compounds to o-quinones, a browning factor. Browning reduces apple taste, color, and food value. Arctic apples, a non-browning group of apples introduced to the United States market in 2019, have been genetically modified to silence the expression of polyphenol oxidase, thereby delaying a browning effect and improving apple eating quality. The US Food and Drug Administration in 2015, and Canadian Food Inspection Agency in 2017, determined that Arctic apples are as safe and nutritious as conventional apples.

=== Other products ===
Apple seed oil is obtained by pressing apple seeds for manufacturing cosmetics.

== In culture ==
=== Germanic paganism ===
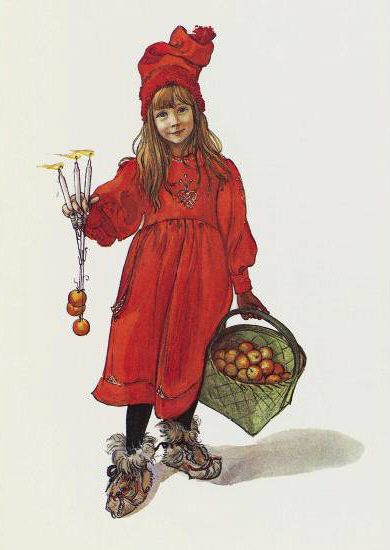
Brita as Iduna (1901) by Carl Larsson

In Norse mythology, the goddess Iðunn is portrayed in the Prose Edda (written in the 13th century by Snorri Sturluson) as providing apples to the gods that give them eternal youthfulness. The English scholar H. R. Ellis Davidson links apples to religious practices in Germanic paganism, from which Norse paganism developed. She points out that buckets of apples were found in the Oseberg ship burial site in Norway, and that fruits and nuts have been found in the early graves of the Germanic peoples in England and elsewhere in Europe. The fruits and nuts may have had a symbolic meaning, and nuts are still a recognized symbol of fertility in southwest England.

Davidson notes a connection between apples and the Vanir, a tribe of gods associated with fertility in Norse mythology, citing an instance of eleven "golden apples" being given to woo the beautiful Gerðr by Skírnir, who was acting as messenger for the major Vanir god Freyr in stanzas 19 and 20 of Skírnismál. Davidson also notes a further connection between fertility and apples in Norse mythology in chapter 2 of the Völsunga saga: when the major goddess Frigg sends King Rerir an apple after he prays to Odin for a child, Frigg's messenger (in the guise of a crow) drops the apple in his lap as he sits atop a mound. Rerir's wife's consumption of the apple results in a six-year pregnancy and the birth (by Caesarean section) of their son—the hero Völsung.

Further, Davidson points out the "strange" phrase "Apples of Hel" used in an 11th-century poem by the skald Thorbiorn Brúnarson. She states this may imply that the apple was thought of by Brúnarson as the food of the dead. Further, Davidson notes that the potentially Germanic goddess Nehalennia is sometimes depicted with apples and that parallels exist in early Irish stories. Davidson asserts that while cultivation of the apple in Northern Europe extends back to at least the time of the Roman Empire and came to Europe from the Near East, the native varieties of apple trees growing in Northern Europe are small and bitter. Davidson concludes that in the figure of Iðunn "we must have a dim reflection of an old symbol: that of the guardian goddess of the life-giving fruit of the other world."

=== Greek mythology ===
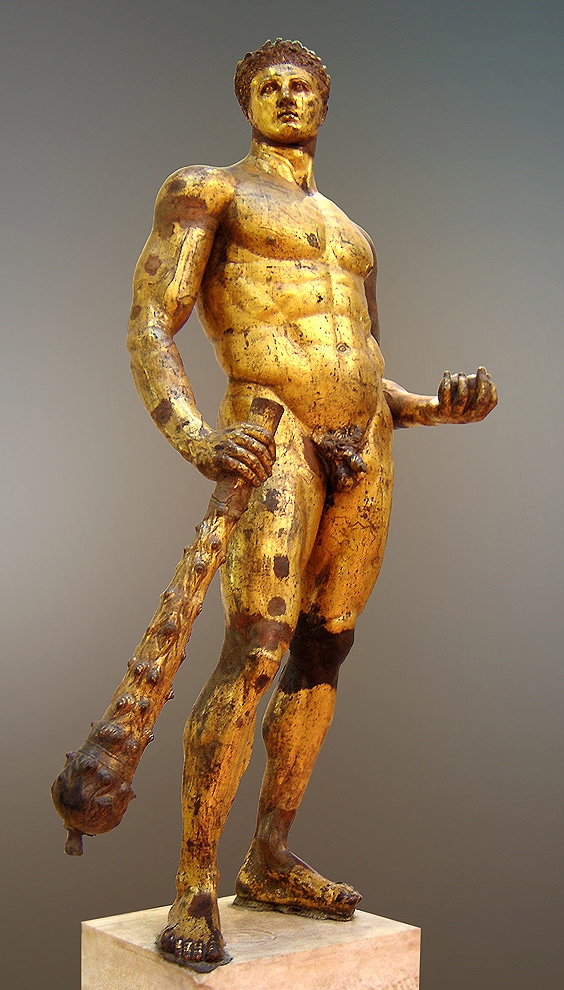
Heracles with the apple of Hesperides

Apples appear in many religious traditions, including Greek and Roman mythology where it has an ambiguous symbolism of discord, fertility, or courtship. In Greek mythology, the Greek hero Heracles, as a part of his Twelve Labours, was required to travel to the Garden of the Hesperides and pick the golden apples off the Tree of Life growing at its center.

The Greek goddess of discord, Eris, became disgruntled after she was excluded from the wedding of Peleus and Thetis. In retaliation, she tossed a golden apple inscribed Καλλίστη (Kallistē, "For the most beautiful one"), into the wedding party. Three goddesses claimed the apple: Hera, Athena, and Aphrodite. Paris of Troy was appointed to select the recipient. After being bribed by both Hera and Athena, Aphrodite tempted him with the most beautiful woman in the world, Helen of Sparta. He awarded the apple to Aphrodite, thus indirectly causing the Trojan War.

The apple was thus considered, in ancient Greece, sacred to Aphrodite. To throw an apple at someone was to symbolically declare one's love; and similarly, to catch it was to symbolically show one's acceptance of that love. An epigram claiming authorship by Plato states:

I throw the apple at you, and if you are willing to love me, take it and share your girlhood with me; but if your thoughts are what I pray they are not, even then take it, and consider how short-lived is beauty.

— Plato, Epigram VII

Atalanta, also of Greek mythology, raced all her suitors in an attempt to avoid marriage. She outran all but Hippomenes (also known as Melanion, a name possibly derived from melon, the Greek word for both "apple" and fruit in general), who defeated her by cunning, not speed. Hippomenes knew that he could not win in a fair race, so he used three golden apples (gifts of Aphrodite, the goddess of love) to distract Atalanta. It took all three apples and all of his speed, but Hippomenes was finally successful, winning the race and Atalanta's hand.

=== Celtic mythology ===
Both the fruit and tree are celebrated throughout Celtic mythology, and folklore as an emblem of fruitfulness and immortality.

==== Arthurian legend and Welsh mythology ====
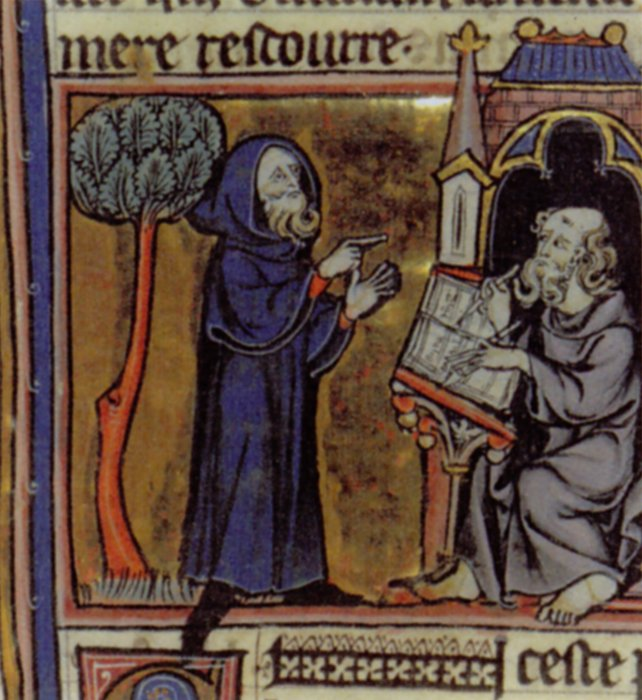
Early Welsh stories about Merlin often feature apple trees. (Merlin dictating his prophecies to his scribe, 13th-century miniature from Robert de Boron's "Merlin en prose".)

Early stories in Medieval Welsh literature heavily feature apple trees. In the Cad Goddeu (English: Battle of the Trees) (said to be written by the sixth century Bard Taliesin), the apple tree is praised as a noble tree tied to sacred knowledge and poetic magic, but is also depicted as laughing with pride when Gwydion brings the trees to life. The 6th-10th century poem Yr Afallennau (English: The Aapple Trees) describes how the wizard Merlin converses with an apple tree in making his prophesies. In Geoffrey of Monmouth's twelfth century poem, Vita Merlini (English: Life of Merlin) the author describes how after losing his sanity, Merlin retreats to a magical sanctuary of nineteen beautiful, fruit-bearing apple trees.

In his previous work, Historia Regum Britanniae, Geoffrey names a magical island as Insula Avallonis. This name derives from the Welsh language word afallen (English: apple tree/fruit tree), and the Old Welsh name Afallach.

==== Irish mythology ====
The tradition of a sacred "apple island" appears throughout the Celtic world, as in the Irish name for the Celtic Otherworld, Emain Ablach, which can be interpreted as 'Emain of the Apples'. In the Ulster Cycle the soul of Cú Roí was confined in an apple that lay in the stomach of a salmon which appeared once every seven years. Cúchulainn once gained his escape by following the path of a rolled apple. An apple-tree grew from the grave of the tragic lover Ailinn. In the Irish tale Echtra Condla (The Adventure of Conle), Conle the son of Conn is fed an apple by a fairy lover, which sustains him with food and drink for a month without diminishing; but it also makes him long for the woman and the beautiful country of women to which his lover is enticing him. In the Irish story from the Mythological Cycle, Oidheadh Chlainne Tuireann, the first task given the Children of Tuireann is to retrieve the Apples of the Hesperides (or Hisbernia).

=== China ===
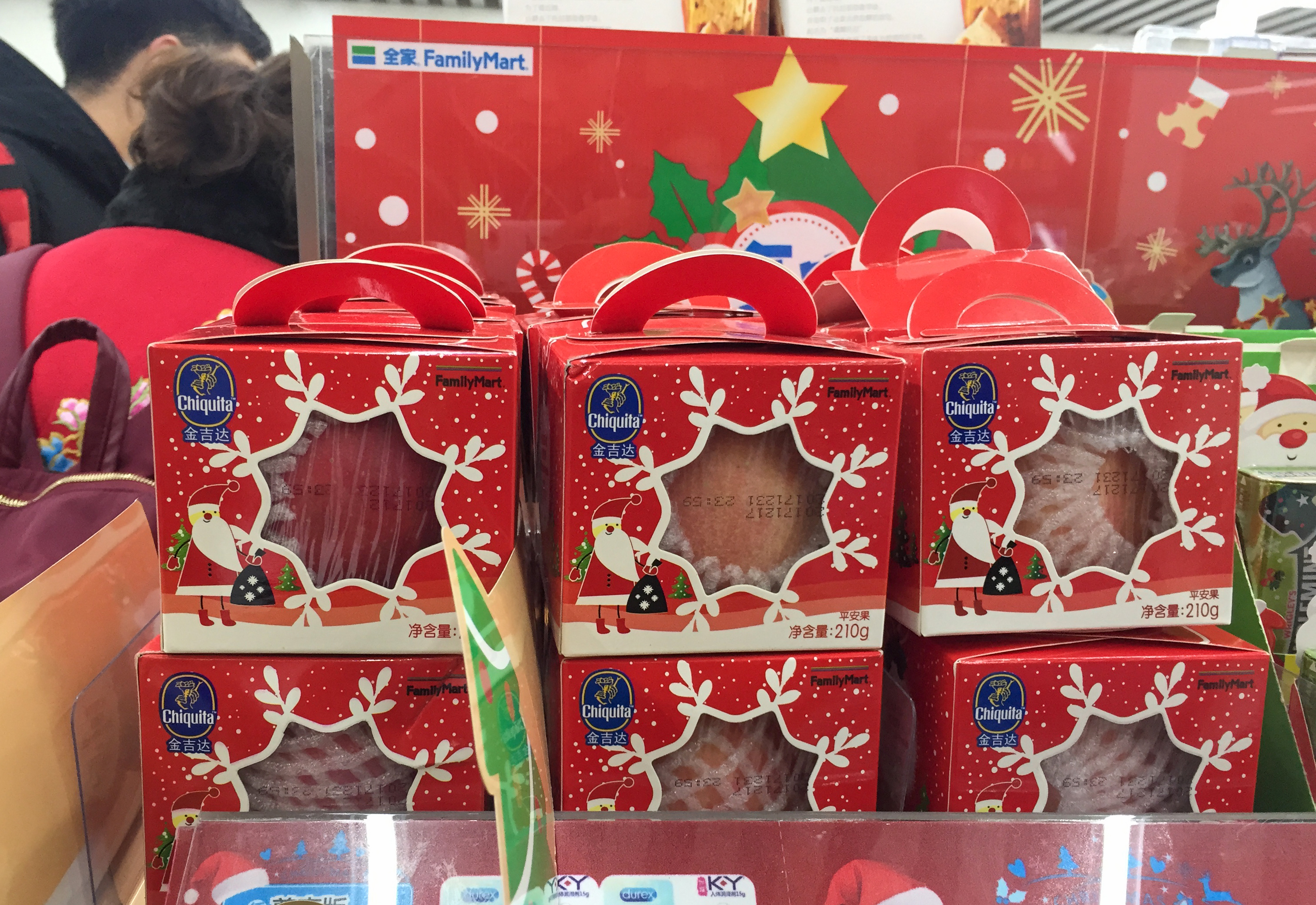
Píngānguǒ ("Peace apples") on sale in Beijing for Christmas Eve (2017)

In China, apples symbolise peace, since the sounds of the first element ("píng") in the words "apple" (苹果, Píngguǒ) and "peace" (平安, Píng'ān) are homophonous in Mandarin and Cantonese. When these two words are combined, the word Píngānguǒ (平安果, "Peace apples") is formed. This association developed further as the name for Christmas Eve in Mandarin is Píngānyè (平安夜, "Peaceful/Quiet Evening"), which made the gifting of apples at this season to friends and associates popular, as a way to wish them peace and safety.

=== Christian art ===
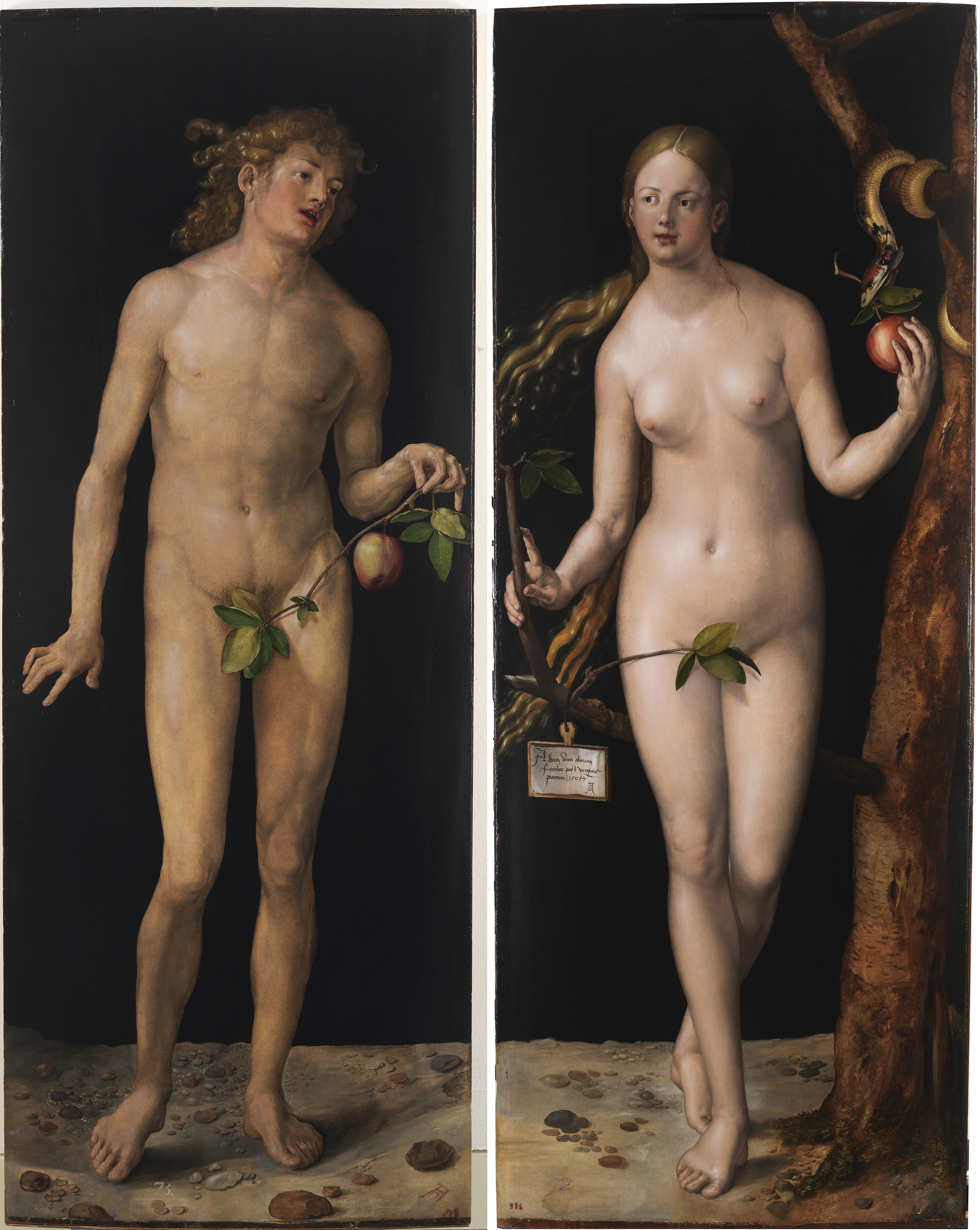
Adam and Eve by Albrecht Dürer (1507), showcasing the apple as a symbol of sin

Though the forbidden fruit of Eden in the Book of Genesis is not identified, popular Christian tradition has held that it was an apple that Eve coaxed Adam to share with her. The origin of the popular identification with a fruit unknown in the Middle East in biblical times is found in wordplay with the Latin words mālum (an apple) and mălum (an evil), each of which is normally written malum. The tree of the forbidden fruit is called "the tree of the knowledge of good and evil" in Genesis 2:17, and the Latin for "good and evil" is bonum et malum.

Renaissance painters may also have been influenced by the story of the golden apples in the Garden of Hesperides. As a result, in the story of Adam and Eve, the apple became a symbol for knowledge, immortality, temptation, the fall of man into sin, and sin itself. The larynx in the human throat has been called the "Adam's apple" because of a notion that it was caused by the forbidden fruit remaining in the throat of Adam. The apple as symbol of sexual seduction has been used to imply human sexuality, possibly in an ironic vein.

=== Proverb ===
The proverb, "An apple a day keeps the doctor away", addressing the supposed health benefits of the fruit, has been traced to 19th-century Wales, where the original phrase was "Eat an apple on going to bed, and you'll keep the doctor from earning his bread". In the 19th century and early 20th, the phrase evolved to "an apple a day, no doctor to pay" and "an apple a day sends the doctor away"; the phrasing now commonly used was first recorded in 1922.

== See also ==
- Apple chip
- Apple cider
- Apple juice
- Applecrab, apple–crabapple hybrids for eating
- Isaac Newton's apple tree
- Johnny Appleseed
- List of apple dishes
