= Sweet Bough =

Apple cultivar

'Sweet Bough'
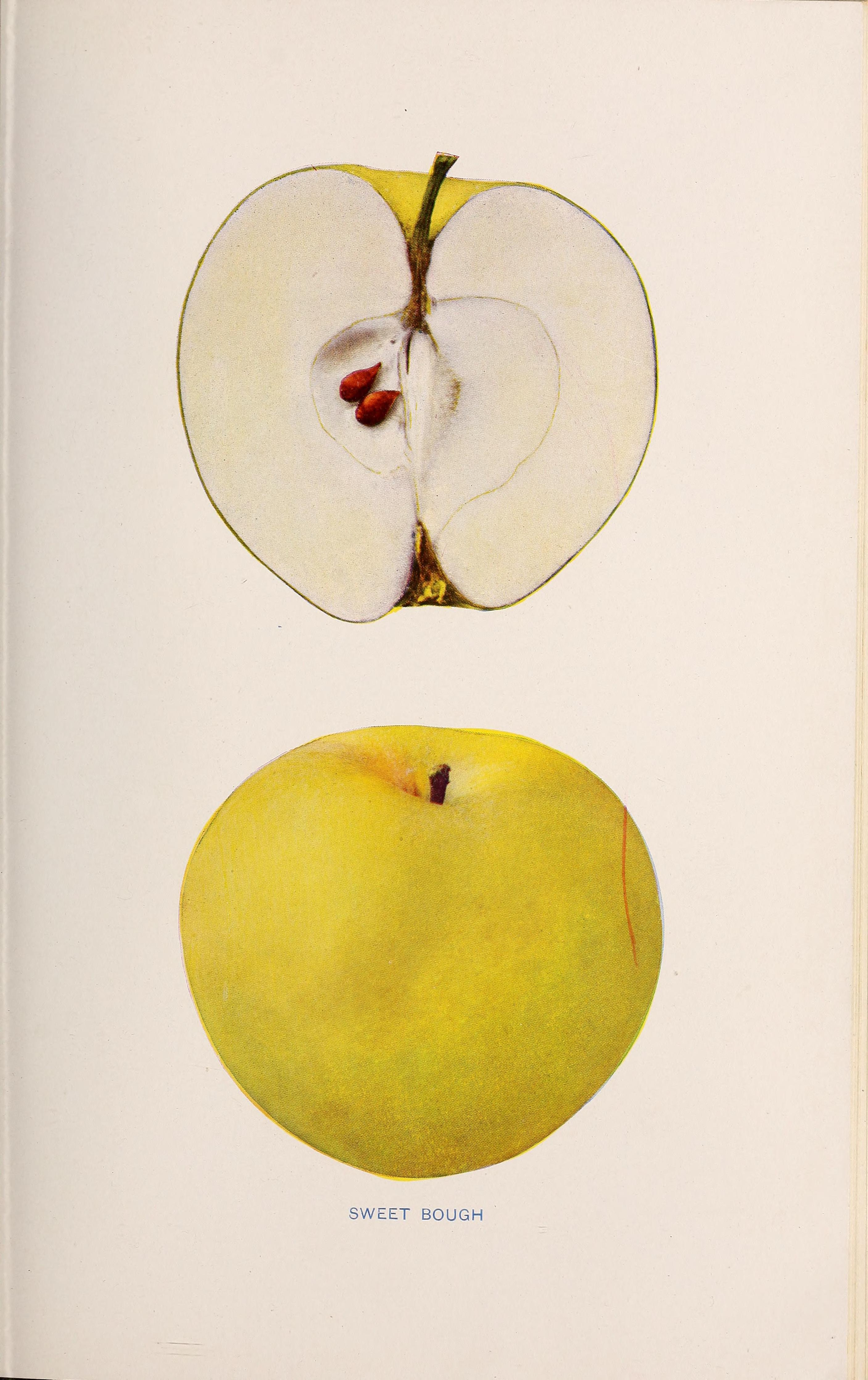
- Species: Malus domestica

'Sweet Bough' is an early ripening cultivar of domesticated apple also known by various other names including 'August Sweeting', 'Early Yellow Bough', and 'White Sugar'. It is also incorrectly known as 'Washington'.
