= Tomato seed oil =

Vegetable oil extracted from the seeds of tomatoes

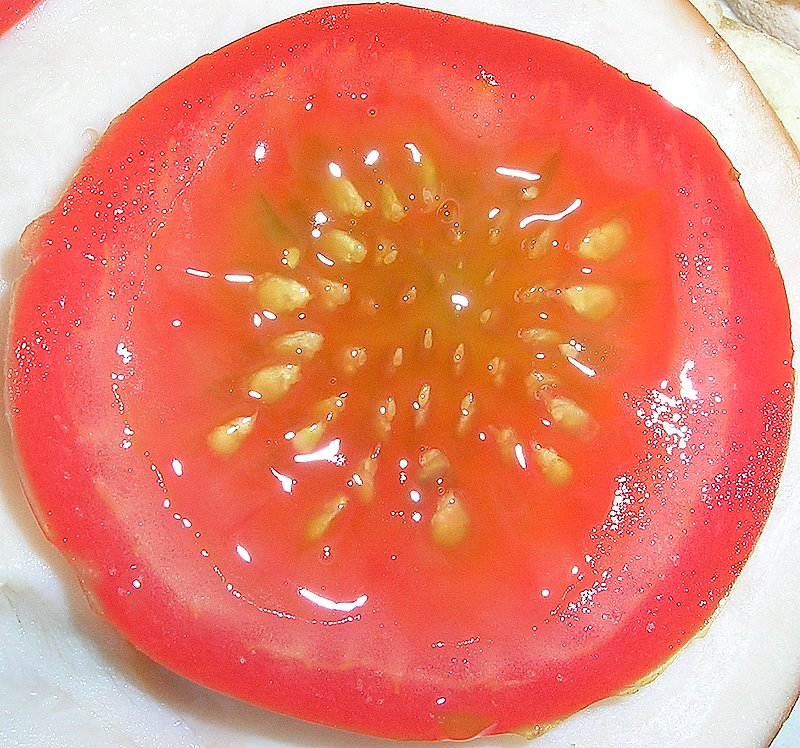
Tomato seeds

Tomato seed oil is a vegetable oil extracted from the seeds of tomatoes.

The possibility of extracting oil from tomato seeds was studied in the United States in 1915. Seeds were obtained from a variety of locations and bred and pressed to produce oil. This was refined using an alkali and then clarified with fuller's earth. The resulting oil was pale yellow and considered suitable for dressing salads.

The seeds have been given renewed attention as there is pressure to utilise the waste products of tomato processing, in which seeds are the largest component. In Greece, over a million tons of tomatoes are processed each year and the resulting quantity of seeds might be used to produce up to 2000 tons of oil. The oil from Greek seeds has been extracted by using ether as a solvent. When analysed, it was found to contain a high proportion of unsaturated fatty acids, especially linoleic acid.

== Botanical name ==
Tomato belongs to the family Solanaceae.

species: Solanum lycopersicum.

== Tomato cultivation in India ==
Soil: sandy to heavy clay, pH 6.0-7.0. well drained, light.

Plant: an unarmed spreading, pubescent herb with characteristic odour.

Cultivation: It is cultivated all over India. Major states are Maharashtra, Bihar, Karnataka, U.P, Orissa, Andhra Pradesh, Madhya Pradesh, and Assam.

Climate: Climate should be warm with plenty of moisture and sunshine.

=== Tomato seeds ===
Contains: 8.95% moisture, 27.62% protein, 24.40% fat, 0.56% lecithin, 13.60% fiber, and 40.20% of ash. N-free extracts are present up to 21%. Seeds form only 0.5% of tomato. Seeds are waste products in food industries manufacturing tomato juice, sauce, ketchup and food colours such as lycopene and beta carotene. Seeds are recovered from discarded waste product by flotation. In India the potential availability of seeds will be 7500 tonnes per annum.

==== Contents of tomato seed ====
Substance	Percentage(%)
Moisture	10.0
Oil(fat)	24-25
Proteins	27-28
Fibre	13-14
Lecithin	0.56
N-free Extract	21

=== Tomato seed oil ===
Tomato seed contains 24-25% of oil, but 15-17% oil can be recovered by crushing in expellers. Tomato oil is brown in color with strong odour. It contains saturated fatty acids up to 14-18%, and unsaturated fatty acids up to 76-80%. Fatty acid composition of Tomato Seed oil

Fatty acids	percentage(%)up to
stearic acid (C18:0)	20.0%
Oleic acid (C18:1)	25.0%
Linoleic acid (C18:2)	50.0%
Linolenic acid (C18:3)	2.0-3.0%

Specifications of crude Tomato seed Oil

character	value
Refractive Index at 40^{0}C	1.4603±0.00022
Iodine Value	105±0.7
Saponification value	186-198
Unsaponifiable matter	1.4% max
Moisture	0.5%max
Color 1" cell,(y+5R)	30(crude Oil)
density, at 25°	0.9160±0.00024
viscosity,(21 °C)mPa.s	75±0.4
Smoke point,°C	176±63.0

=== Usage of tomato seed oil ===
- In making of non-yellowing alkyds for paints
- In preparation of margarine
- In making of soaps
- In the preparation of salad oils
