= Apple products =

Apple products may refer to:

- List of apple dishes, prepared foods using apples
- Apple § Uses, food and non-food products of the apple
- List of Apple products, a timeline of products made by Apple Inc.
