= List of apple dishes =

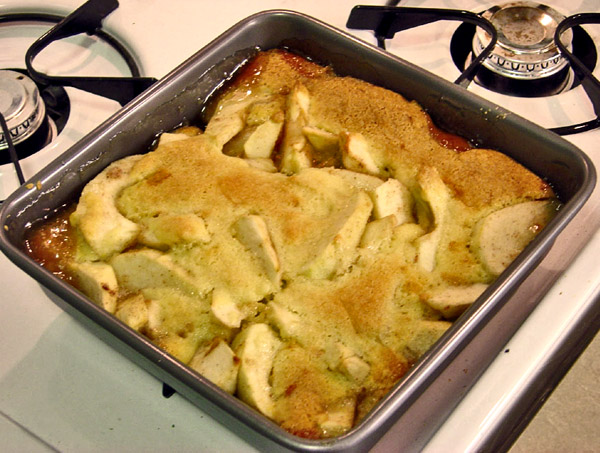
Apple cobbler

The following dishes use apple as a primary ingredient. Apple beverages are also included on this list.

== Apple dishes ==
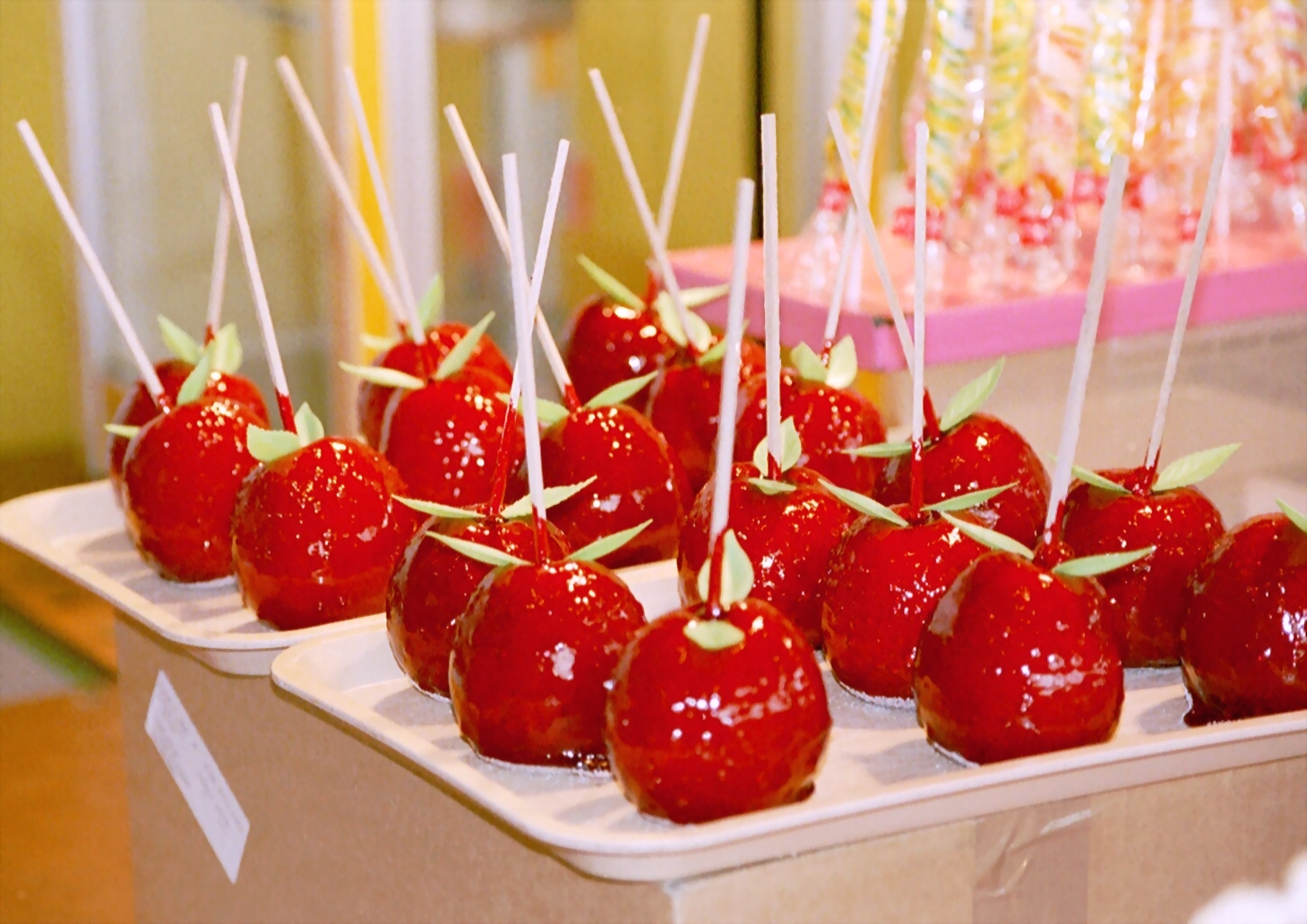
Candy apples

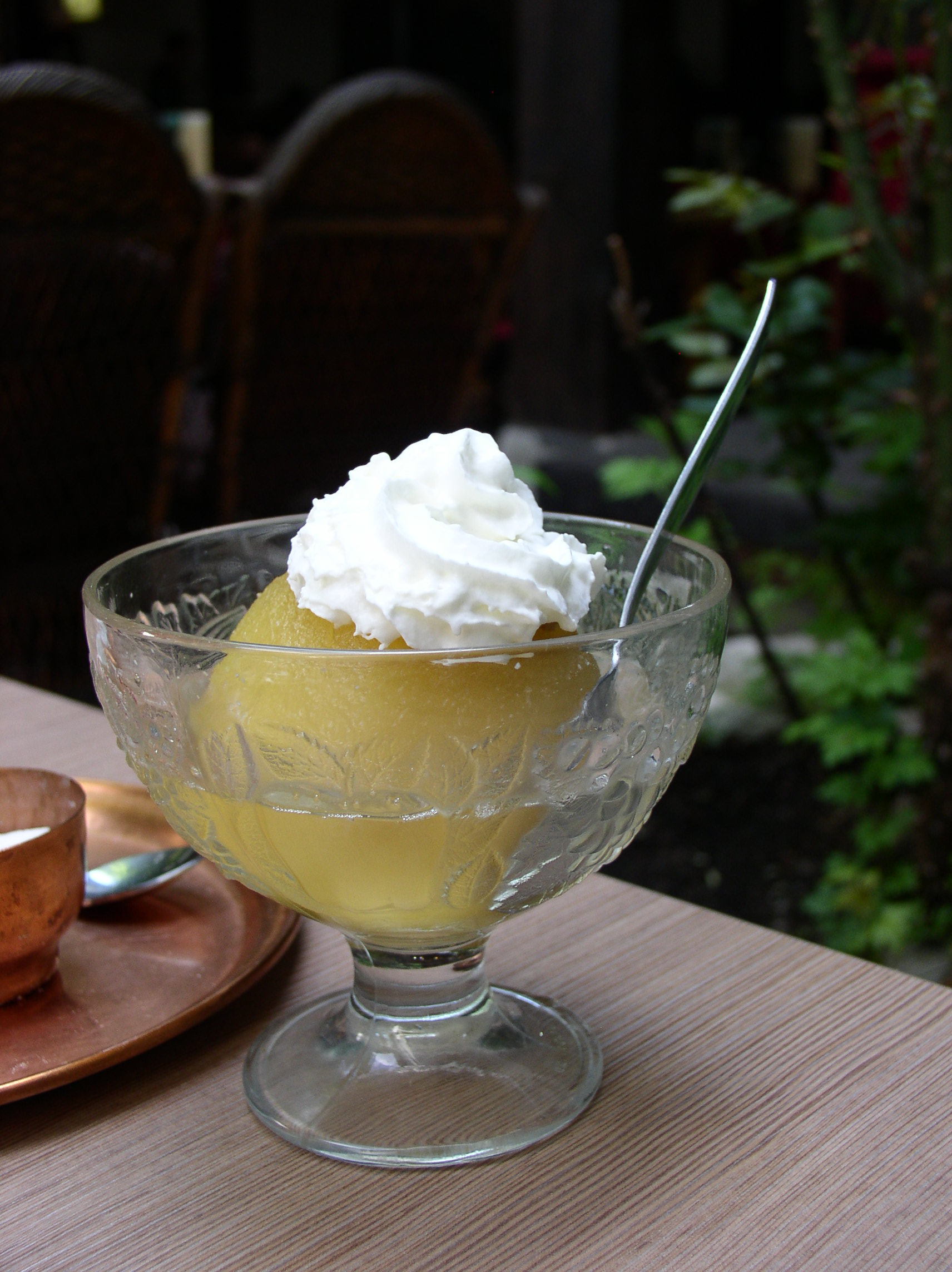
Tufahije is a Bosnian dessert made of walnut-stuffed apples stewed in water with sugar.

- Æbleflæsk – Danish pork dish fried with apples, thyme and sugar
- Apple butter – Concentrated form of apple sauce
- Apple cake – Cakes made with apples
- Apple cheese – Traditional Lithuanian dessert
- Apple chips – Food
- Apple cider – Non-alcoholic apple beverage
- Apple cider cookie – Cookie made with apple cider
- Apple cobbler – Baked dish resembling a pie
- Apple crisp – Apple-based snack, with streusel topping
- Apple crumble – Baked fruit dessert
- Apple dumpling – Pastry-wrapped apple
- Apple fritter – Deep-fried sweet or savoury snack
- Applejack – Alcoholic drink produced from apples
- Apple juice – Juice produced from apples
- Apple pie – Dessert pie made with apples
- Apple sauce – Purée made from apples
- Applesauce cake – Dessert
- Apple soda – Sweetened non-alcoholic drink, often carbonated
- Apple strudel – Traditional Austrian pastry
- Apple turnover – Baked or fried filled good
- Baked apple – Culinary dish
- Bird's nest pudding – Dessert resembling eggs in a nest
- Brown Betty – American dessert
- Calvados – French apple brandy
- Calvados Roger Groult – Brandy produced in France
- Candy apple – Whole apple with a hard candy coating
- Caramel apple – Apple covered with caramel and sometimes nuts
- Chausson aux pommes – French viennoiserie filled with applesauce
- Cider – Fermented alcoholic beverage from apple juice
- Cider doughnut – Type of doughnut
- Cobbler – Baked dish resembling a pie
- Dried apple pie – Pie made with dried apples
- Eve's pudding – Traditional British pudding
- Ice cider – Fermented beverage made from the juice of frozen apples
- Jewish apple cake – Dairy-free apple cake associated with Jewish cuisine
- Međimurska gibanica – Croatian dessert
- Nièr beurre – Preserve of apples that is part of the cuisine and culture of Jersey
- Sirop de Liège – Belgian jam or jelly-like spread
- Tarte Tatin – Caramelised fruit tart
- Tufahije – Poached apple dessert
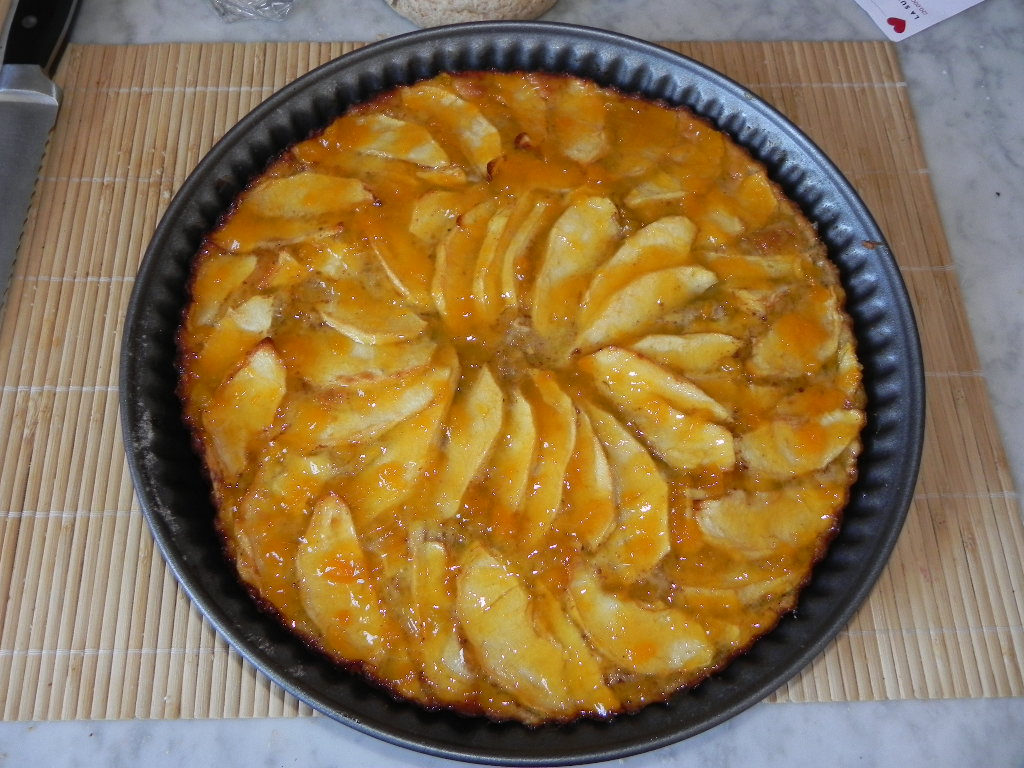
Apple cake

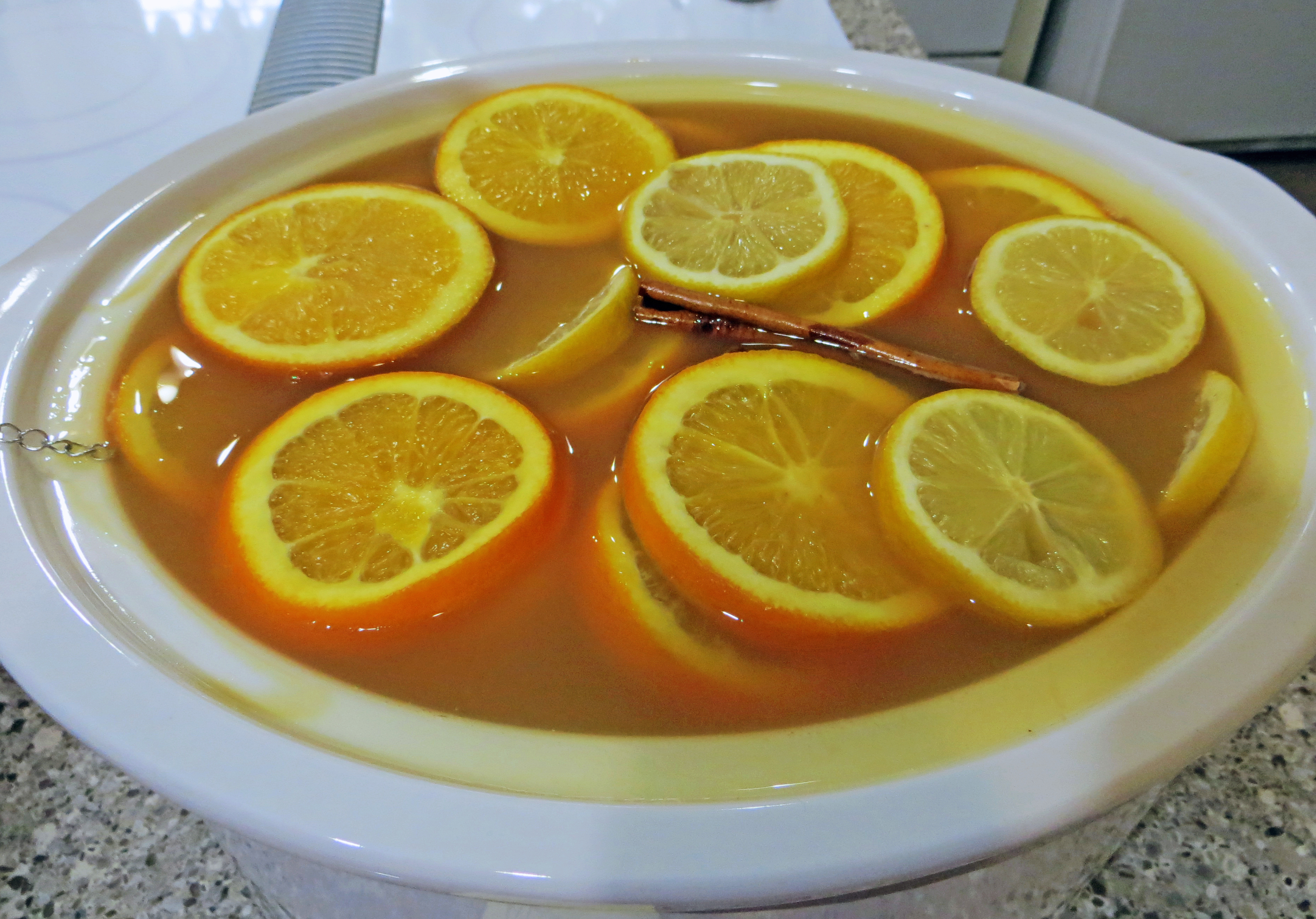
Hot spiced apple cider

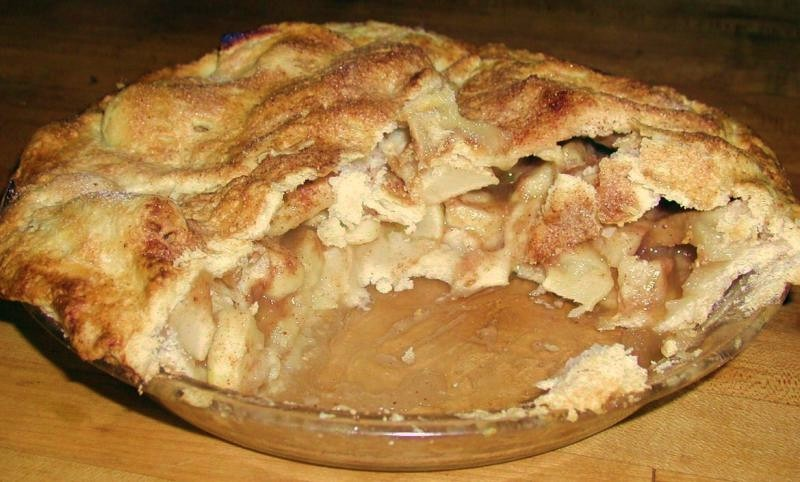
Apple pie

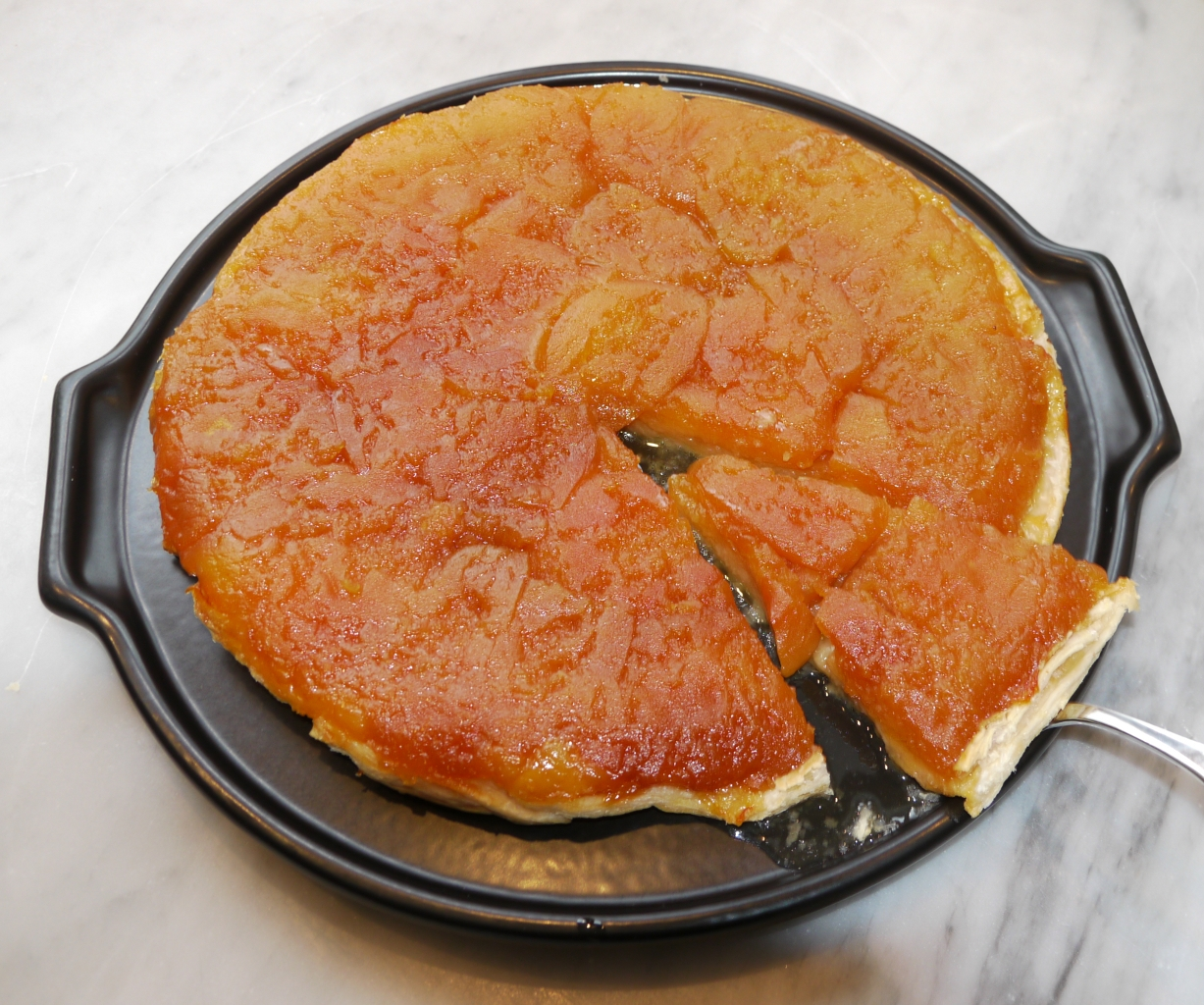
Tarte Tatin

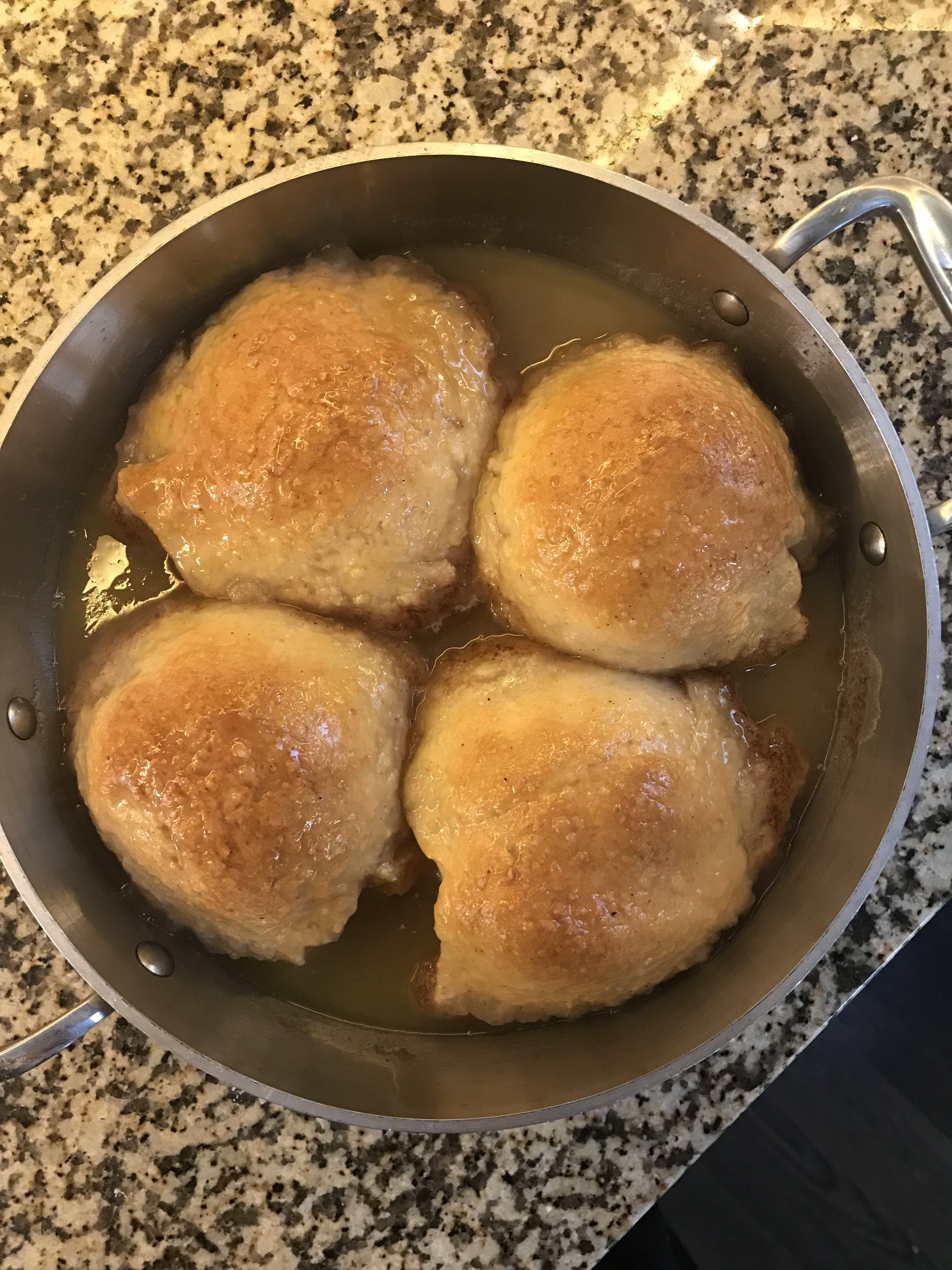
Apple dumplings

== See also ==
- Apple cider vinegar
- Apple Day
- Cooking apple
- List of apple cultivars
- List of culinary fruits
- List of fruit dishes
