= Biffin =

Biffin is a surname. Notable people with the surname include:

- Ray Biffin (born 1949), Australian rules footballer
- Sarah Biffin (1784–1850), English painter

== See also ==
- Norfolk Biffin
