= Bird's nest pudding =

Dessert resembling eggs in a nest

Bird's nest pudding is a dessert designed to resemble eggs in a nest. In one tradition observed in the United States during the 19th and 20th centuries, it is made by peeling and coring apples, pouring over custard, and baking. In another, egg-shaped puddings are placed in a nest constructed from candied citrus peel over a pudding-base. Birds nest pudding is unrelated to the consumption of bird's nests in Chinese cuisine.

== Apple preparations ==
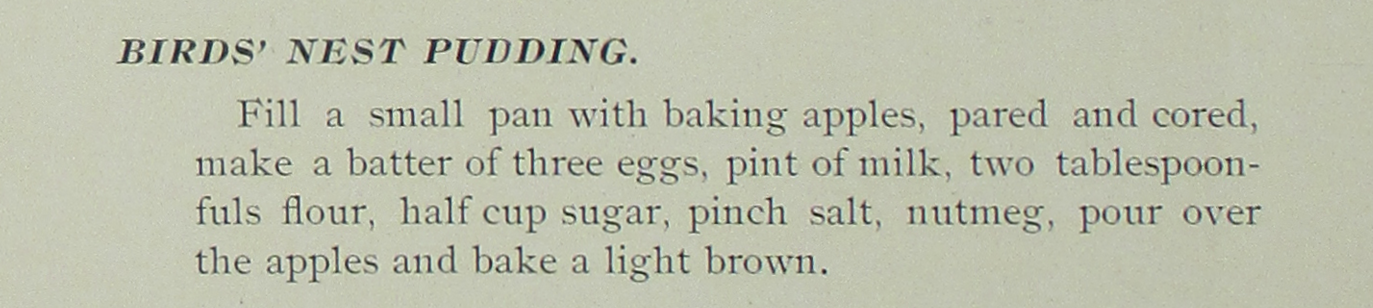
Recipe from Practical Receipts (1892), compiled in Wayne, Pennsylvania

In this tradition, bird's nest pudding was prepared by coring and peeling an apple, sometimes filling the apple's core, then pouring over a flavored custard and baking.

Apples have historically been particularly prominent in the cooking of New England, often in the form of puddings. Among these, bird's nest pudding was among the best known, and several 19th-century cookbook authors such as Lydia Maria Child, Catharine Beecher and Esther Allen Howland gave recipes. Preparations closely resembled recipes for baked apples, including two provided by Beecher which were only distinguished by the addition of custard before baking rather than after. Child's version, published in 1833, lacked any filling. It read:

If you wish to make what is called ‘bird’s nest pudding,’ prepare your custard,—take eight or ten pleasant apples, pare them, and dig out the core, but leave them whole, set them in a pudding dish, pour your custard over them, and bake them about thirty minutes.

Its opening clause may have indicated the dish was new to the area. By the middle of the century in Pennsylvania, the dish had become associated with Victorian England. One recipe, provided by Beecher in 1846, had a mixture of tapioca and water serve as the pudding's custard, a version which became known later in the century as Apple Tapioca Pudding.

Consumption continued in the US into the 20th century, including one preparation that used raisins to fill the cored apple. Alice B. Toklas describes the dish in her 1954 The Alice B. Toklas Cook Book as an ethnic dish, and one of the few in American cookery that merited mention.

== Non-apple preparations ==
In her 1769 cookbook The Experienced English Housekeeper, Elizabeth Raffald gives a recipe instructing "To make a Hen's Nest". Raffald's recipe had cooks prepare a dish of clear calf's foot jelly, onto which they would lay a nest formed from candied lemon peels. Flummery eggs were the final element. These were made by draining small eggshells before pouring flummery inside. Once set, the shells were removed, and the flummery eggs placed inside the nest.

In America, Sarah Tyson Rorer gives a related preparation in her 1886 Philadelphia Cookbook, writing that her Bird's Nest Pudding is "just as troublesome as it reads, but beautiful when done." (Note: Keith Stavely and Kathleen Fitzgerald credit the creation of this dish to Alice M Turner's compiled The New England Cook Book: The Latest and Best Methods for Economy and Luxury at Home, published in Boston in 1905. This reproduces the recipe from Sarah Tyson Rorer's 1886 Philadelphia Cook Book. Rorer's recipe is referenced by William Woys Weaver.) Like Raffald, Rorer's recipe uses candied strips of lemon peel to resemble straw, but differs by using blancmange or cornstarch as the nest's base and as the filling of the eggs. Such preparations have continued into the 20th and 21st centuries in the US. Holly Arnold Kinney, the owner of the Colorado restaurant The Fort prepares the dish as an Easter family tradition, recalling how eggshells were collected and dried in the weeks before the holiday during her childhood. In her modern preparation, flavored and colored blancmange served as the base and filling, and the nest was formed from the candied peel of grapefruit and orange.

== See also ==
- Cooking of apples
- List of apple dishes

== Sources ==
- Quinzio, Jeri (2018). Dessert: A Tale of Happy Endings. London: Reaktion Books. ISBN 978-1-780-23983-5.
- Rorer, Sarah Tyson (1886). Philadelphia Cookbook. Philadelphia, Pennsylvania: Arnold and Company.
- Stavely, Keith; Fitzgerald, Kathleen (2004). America's Founding Food: The Story of New England Cooking. Chapel Hill, North Carolina & London: The University of North Carolina Press. ISBN 0-8078-2894-7.
- Stavely, Keith; Fitzgerald, Kathleen (2011). Northern Hospitality: Cooking by the Book in New England. Amherst & Boston: University of Massachusetts Press. ISBN 978-1-55849-861-7.
- Vester, Katharina (2015). A Taste of Power: Food and American Identities. Oakland, California: University of California Press. ISBN 978-0-520-28497-5.
- Weaver, William Woys (1982). A Quaker Woman's Cookbook: The Domestic Cooking of Elizabeth Ellicott Lea. Philadelphia, Pennsylvania: University of Pennsylvania Press. ISBN 0-8122-7848-8.
