= Baked apple =

Culinary dish

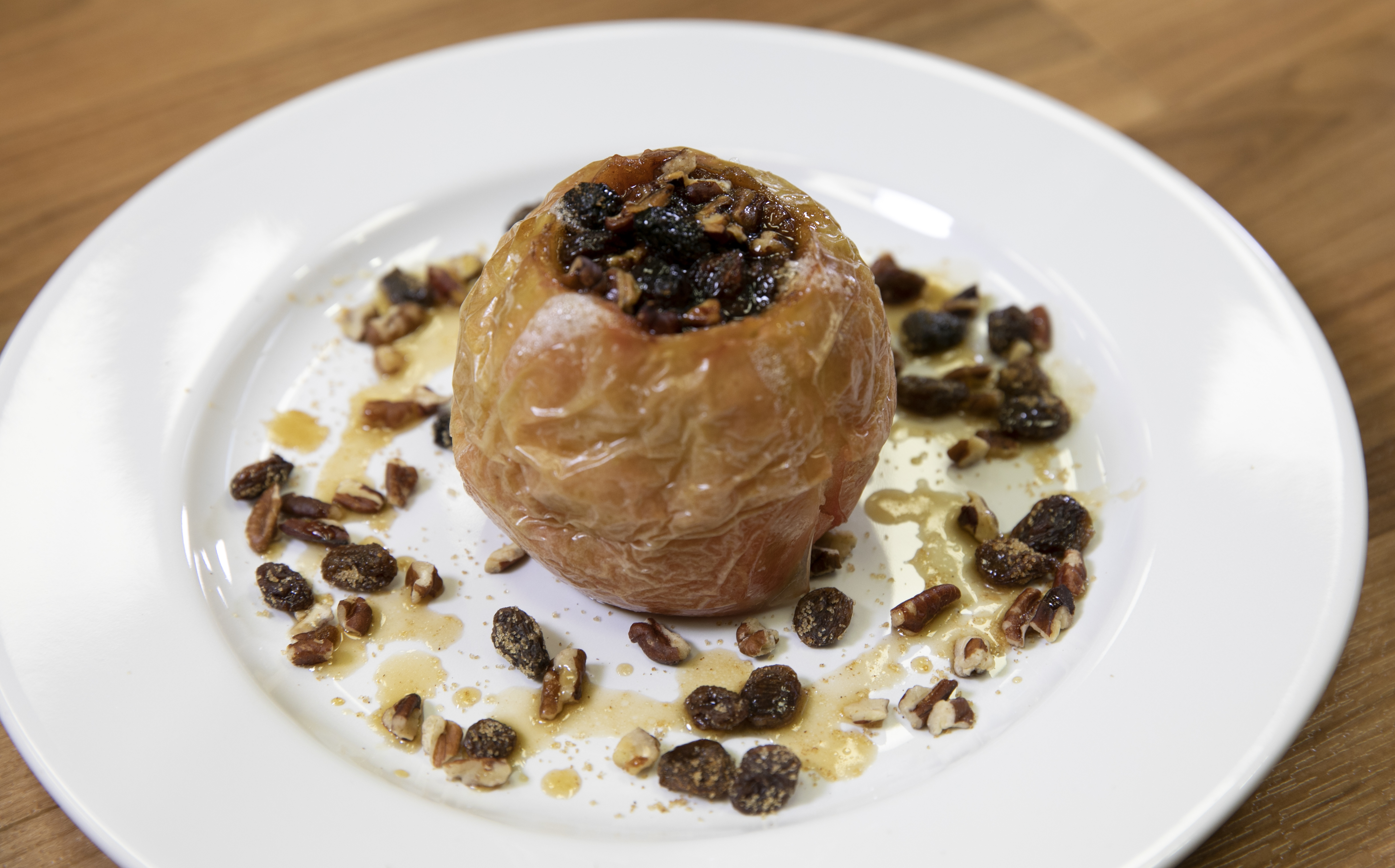
A baked apple stuffed with raisins and nuts

A baked apple is a dish consisting of an apple baked in an oven, until it becomes soft. The core is usually removed and the resulting cavity is stuffed with sweet or savory fillings and seasonings.

Baked apples are found in many European cuisines, including colonial ones. In Germany, baked apples are often served during the Christmas season.

== Preparation ==
The apples are cored, often not through the bottom, and sometimes peeled halfway down to prevent bursting. The resulting cavity is stuffed with fillings and seasonings.

Fillings may be fresh or dried fruits such as raisins, dates, prunes, oatmeal, as well as nuts such as pistachios. Marzipan is sometimes used in Germany, while walnuts are typical in Bulgaria; the Bosnian dish tufahije is also stuffed with walnuts, but is poached rather than baked.

Seasonings may include sweeteners such as brown sugar, honey, maple syrup, or fruit preserves; spices such as cinnamon, nutmeg, cloves, aniseed, and mace; butter; and alcohol such as brandy, Calvados, or wine. Many recipes include lemon juice for tartness. The apples are then baked until soft.

== Variations ==
Pears may be prepared in the same way as baked apples, while a baked apple wrapped in a pastry crust is an apple dumpling. Baked quinces in syrup are a popular dessert in many Mediterranean and Eastern European countries, however these are typically prepared as halves or slices, rather than served whole.

A black cap is a kind of baked apple cut in two crosswise, cored, filled with lemon rind and candied orange peel or orange marmalade, reassembled, and baked with wine and sugar. The oven is started very hot to blacken the tops.

Baked apples may be baked until dry to make them suitable for storage. In the cuisine of Norfolk, England, a biffin or beefing is an apple which is baked between a weight, to flatten it into a cake, and a layer of straw, to absorb moisture, and usually made from the Norfolk Biffin cultivar. It is typically served with cream after the skin is removed.

=== Bratapfel ===
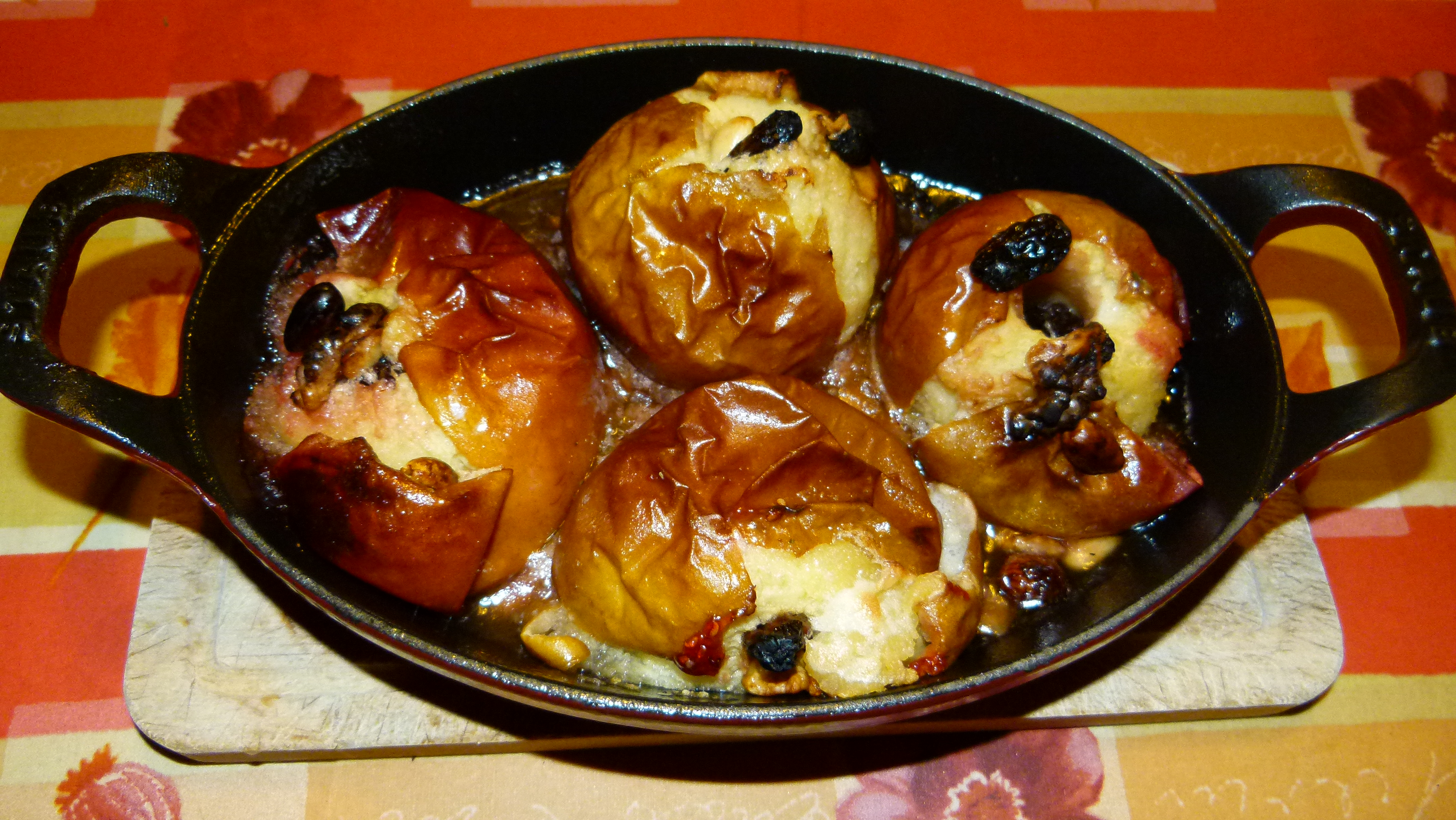
Bratäpfel

German baked apples (German: Bratapfel) are a German dish of baked apples made with more acidic apple varieties like the Boskop apple. They can be prepared with many different fillings and are a common Christmas dish. Often they are served with vanilla custard.

Apples are the most widely grown fruit in Germany, used to prepare many dishes and beverages in German cuisine. Apples were the only locally grown fruit in Germany that kept during the winter months, which made baked apples an economical choice for holiday desserts in the Christmas traditions of Germany or as a sweet main dish in cold weather.

To prepare, the whole apples once cored can be stuffed with assorted fillings made from chopped almonds, marzipan, raisins, rum, butter, lemon juice, sugar, spices and other ingredients. Some versions are baked in a baking dish with white wine and honey and baked until tender. They are usually served with vanilla custard or ice cream. Apples can be baked on top of a wood stove or in the oven in round enamel cast iron dishes called "apple schnitzers". The dish has a spike in the center that cooks the cored apple from the inside out. Schnitzers may be a German invention, no longer widely used in Germany, but still found among Amish communities in the United States.

== Serving ==
Baked apples may be served with any manner of dairy-based toppings, such as custard, crème fraîche, sour cream, ice cream, heavy cream or yogurt. Though usually a dessert, baked apples can also be eaten cold as a breakfast item. Baked apples have also historically been a savory dish, either used as a side dish for roasts or standing on their own, plain or stuffed with sausage or ground meat.

== See also ==
- Apple sauce, sometimes made by baking
- Apple chips, dried apple slices
- Apple dumplings, a similar dish where the apples are wrapped in pastry
- Bird's nest pudding
- Tufahije, a traditional Bosnian dessert
- List of apple dishes
