= Chausson aux pommes =

French viennoiserie filled with applesauce

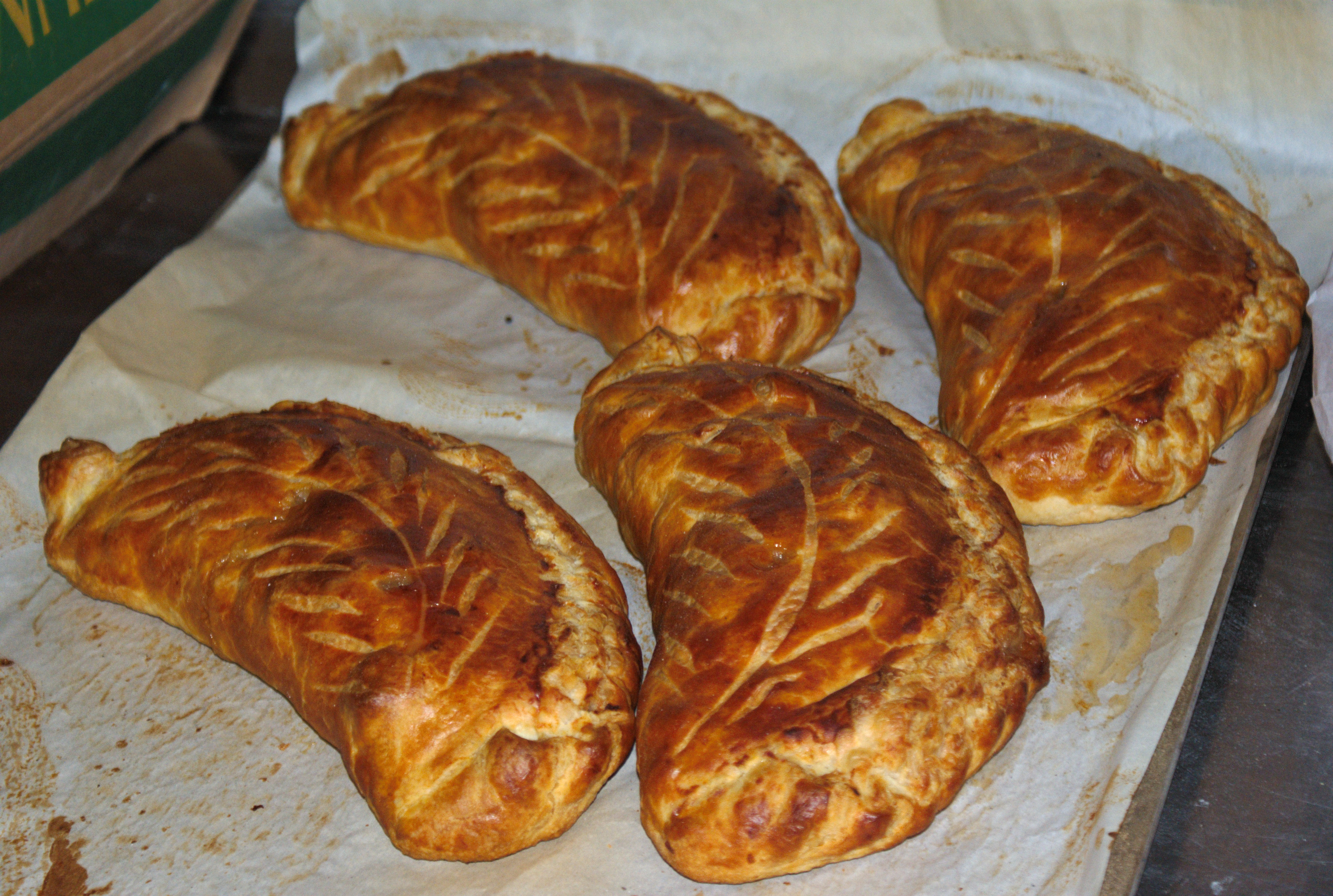
Chausson aux pommes

The Chausson aux Pommes (French pronunciation: [ʃosɔ̃ o pɔm]; or gosette aux pommes [ɡozɛt o pɔm] in Belgium) is a Viennoiserie filled with applesauce. It is a form of turnover. An alternative to apple, filled with lemon cream, is known as a Chausson au Citron.

== Origin ==
It originated in the 16th century. The legend says that after a plague epidemic that killed a part of Saint-Calais' population in 1580, the chatelaine would have offered a sort of apple pie to the survivors forced to still live there.

After the end of the epidemic in Saint-Calais (Pays-de-la-Loire region in France), considered by many as a miracle, a procession was organized to celebrate the event each first Sunday of September, including a sale of the apple pastry was organized in memory of the chatelaine's gesture. Since then, the celebration evolved but remained as a gastronomic and traditional meet up.

Since the 18th century, the pastry is called chausson aux pommes after the technique used to fill the viennoiserie dough with an apple puree, just like putting on slippers.

== Perpetuation of the tradition ==
In 1992, the Confrérie of Chausson aux Pommes was created to perpetuate this tradition. The chausson aux pommes has become an emblematic product of Saint-Calais.

In September 2023, the city of Saint-Calais celebrated the 393rd edition of the Chausson aux pommes' festival. Those celebrations usually gather several thousands of visitors each year and host shows, markets, exhibitions, and concerts.

== See also ==
- Apple strudel
- List of apple dishes
- List of pastries
- Turnover (food)
