= Apple dumpling =

Pastry-wrapped apple

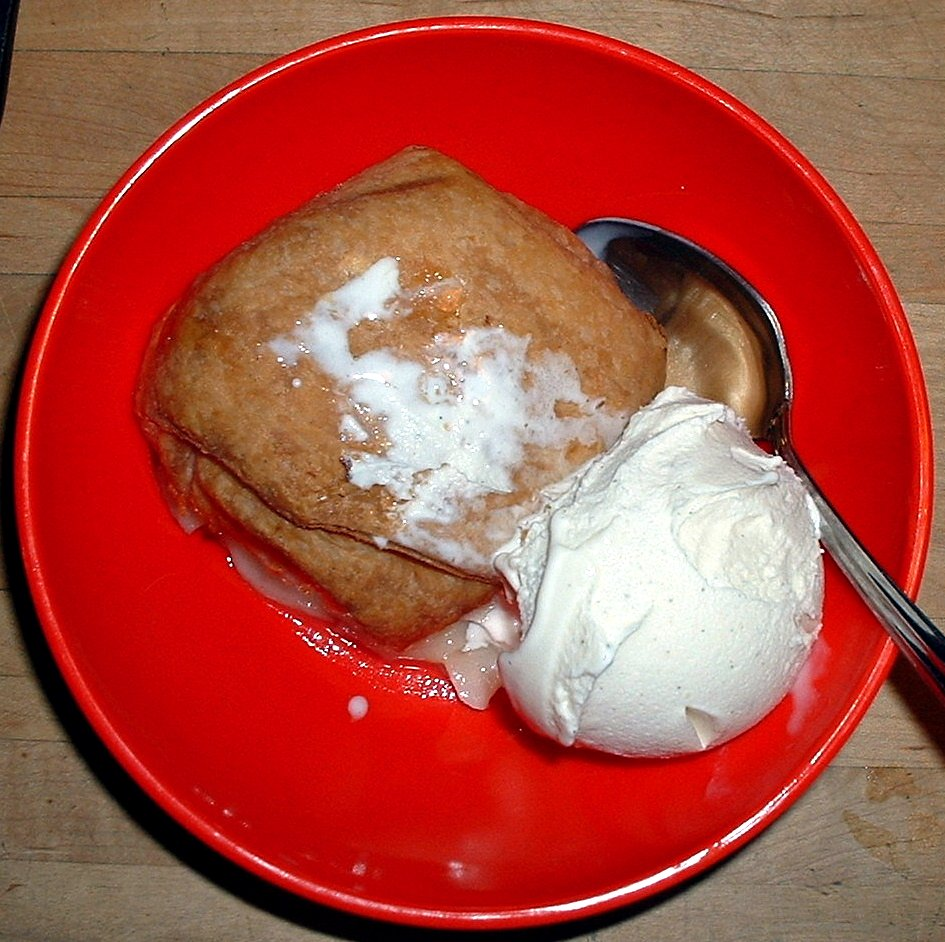
- An apple dumpling served with vanilla ice cream
- Type: Pastry
- Course: Breakfast, main dish, dessert
- Main ingredients: Dough, apples, cinnamon, sugar, sometimes dried fruit and spices

An apple dumpling is a baked or boiled pastry-wrapped apple. To prepare apple dumplings, apples are peeled, cored and sometimes quartered and placed on a portion of dough. The hole from the core may be filled with cinnamon, butter and sugar and sometimes dried fruit such as raisins, sultanas, or currants. The dough is folded over the apples and sealed. Sometimes, a spiced sauce is poured over the dumplings which are then baked until tender; the sugar and butter create a sweet sauce. Apple dumplings can be served hot, cold, or room temperature for breakfast, dessert, or as a main dish.

== History ==
Boiled apple dumplings are among the earliest of fruit puddings. They were eaten "at all social levels". In 1726 Nicholas Amhurst complained about apple dumplings at Oxford, saying "nothing can be expected from only rot-gut small beer, and heavy apple-dumplings, but stupidity, sleepiness, and indolence." Two recipes for apple dumplings were published in Hannah Glasse's 1747 cookbook. In 1749–1750, when botanist Pehr Kalm traveled from New Jersey to Quebec, he reported having apple dumplings at every meal. In 1754 English agriculturalist William Ellis called them one of the most common foods among farmers, along with bacon and pickled pork.

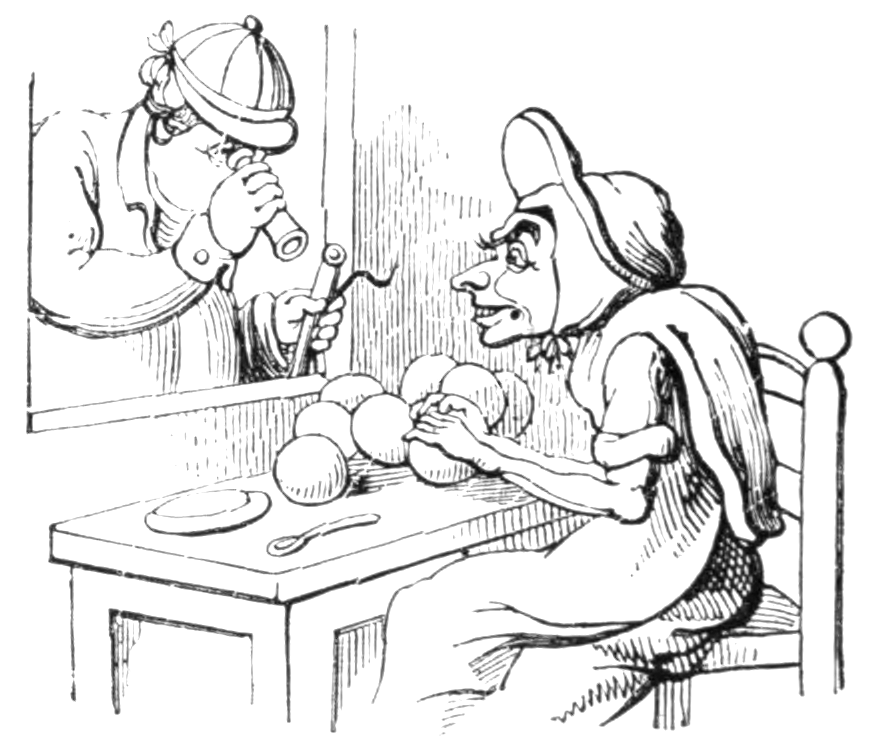
The 18th century Gillray cartoon, Lesson in apple dumplings. "Hay? hay? apple dumplings? - how get the apples in? -how? Are they made without seams?"

A print called Lesson in apple dumplings or Learning to make apple dumplings, variously attributed to British caricaturists James Gillray in 1792 or Richard Newton in 1797, shows a woman making apple dumplings, watched by a man, possibly King George III. The 1801 domestic encyclopedia Oeconomische Encyclopädie oder Allgemeines System der Land-, Haus- und Staats-Wirthschaft includes instructions for making Apfelklöße, "small apple dumplings." In 1810 English caricaturist Thomas Rowlandson created a colored etching called Puff Paste which shows a footman and cook cuddling while the cook makes apple dumplings. In 1838 American physician William Alcott in his book of advice for young wives The Young House-keeper: Or, Thoughts on Food and Cookery said that "apple dumplings are not very objectionable, except for the crust" as long as no spices were added, but goes on to say, "But why should we have the apple dumpling at all? Few would prepare it, or eat it after it was prepared, were it not for the crust, and above all, for the butter, the sauce, or the sugar added to it; but all of these are objectionable." American cookbook author Eliza Leslie included a recipe for baked apple dumplings in the 1851 edition of her cookbook, in a section called "New Receipts." In 1870 an apple dumpling dinner was given by the Bethel A.M.E. church in San Francisco. In 1879 Mark Twain included baked apple dumplings on a list of American foods "unmatched by European hotel cuisine". In 1946 George Orwell was commissioned to write an essay on British Cuisine for an overseas audience, later rejected by the British Council "amid anxiety about postwar austerity", and called out boiled apple dumplings as an example of the "greatest glories of British cookery."

Apple dumplings were Thomas Edison's favorite food. Louis Hughes, born a black slave in Virginia in 1832, recorded an account of a Fourth of July barbecue for the slaves with roasted pigs and sheep, but apple dumplings and peach cobbler were still the favorites "relished by all the slaves". A young pioneer's diary entry for July 4th, 1859 on Oregon Trail records having apple dumplings for supper that evening.

Food historian Bruce Kraig speculated that apple dumplings were popular in the United States because they were "enormously practical in a country where apples grew well and could be dried for year-round use, few individually portioned foods were available, and large boiled dinners required the least tending."

== Ingredients and preparation ==
Apple dumplings are typically made by wrapping a pastry crust around a peeled, cored, and sometimes quartered apple, sometimes stuffing the hollow from the core with butter, sugar, sometimes dried fruits such as raisins, sultanas, or currants, and spices, sealing the pastry, and pouring a spiced sauce over the top before baking or, in the case of older recipes, boiling. The earliest recipes refer to boiling, as few homes had ovens, while many later recipes call for baking. Sauces typically call for sugar or brown sugar and butter boiled with water, sometimes with sliced lemons or spices such as cinnamon added for flavor.

Preparation of baked dumplings

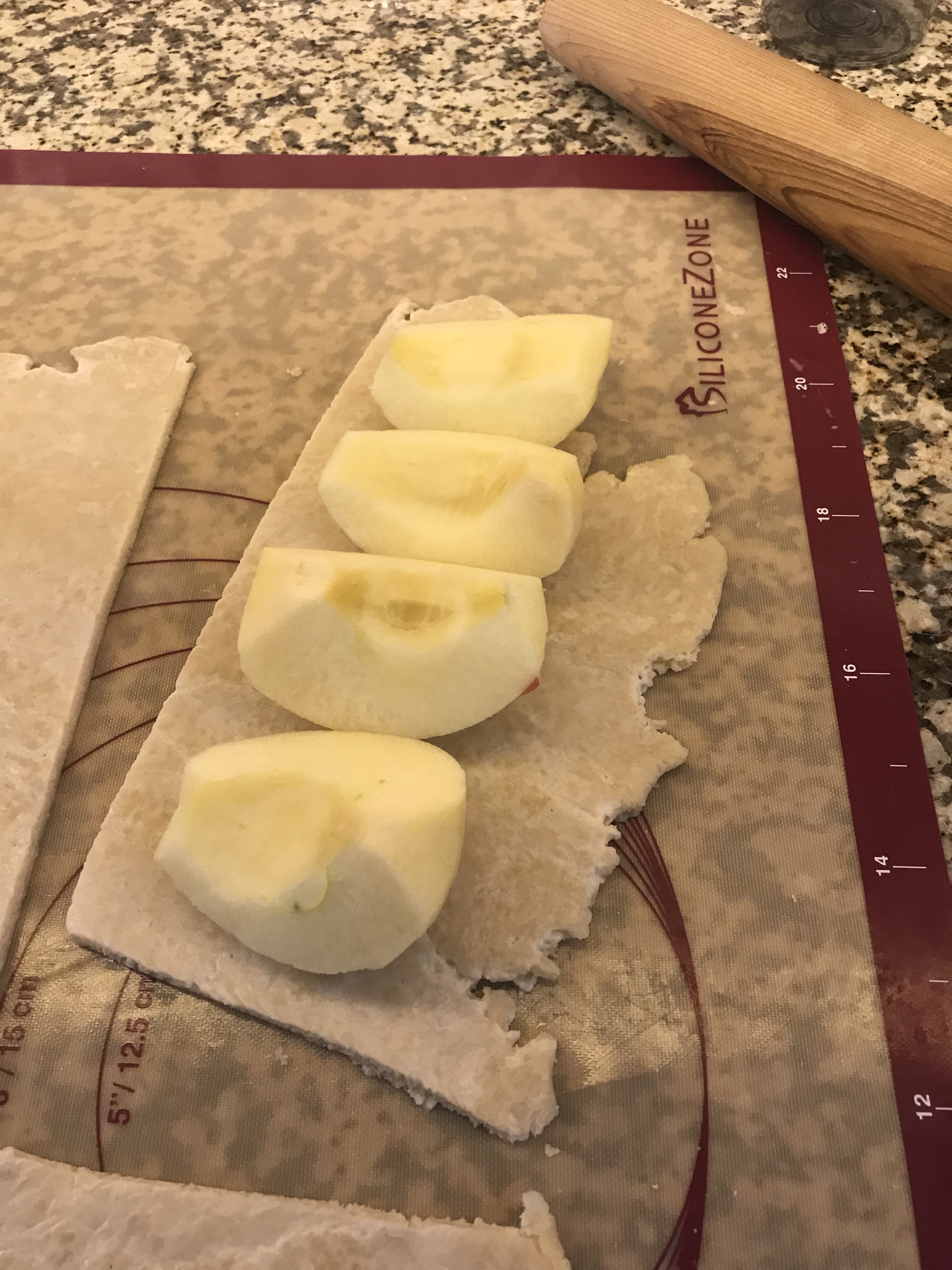
Apples are peeled and laid on a portion of pastry crust

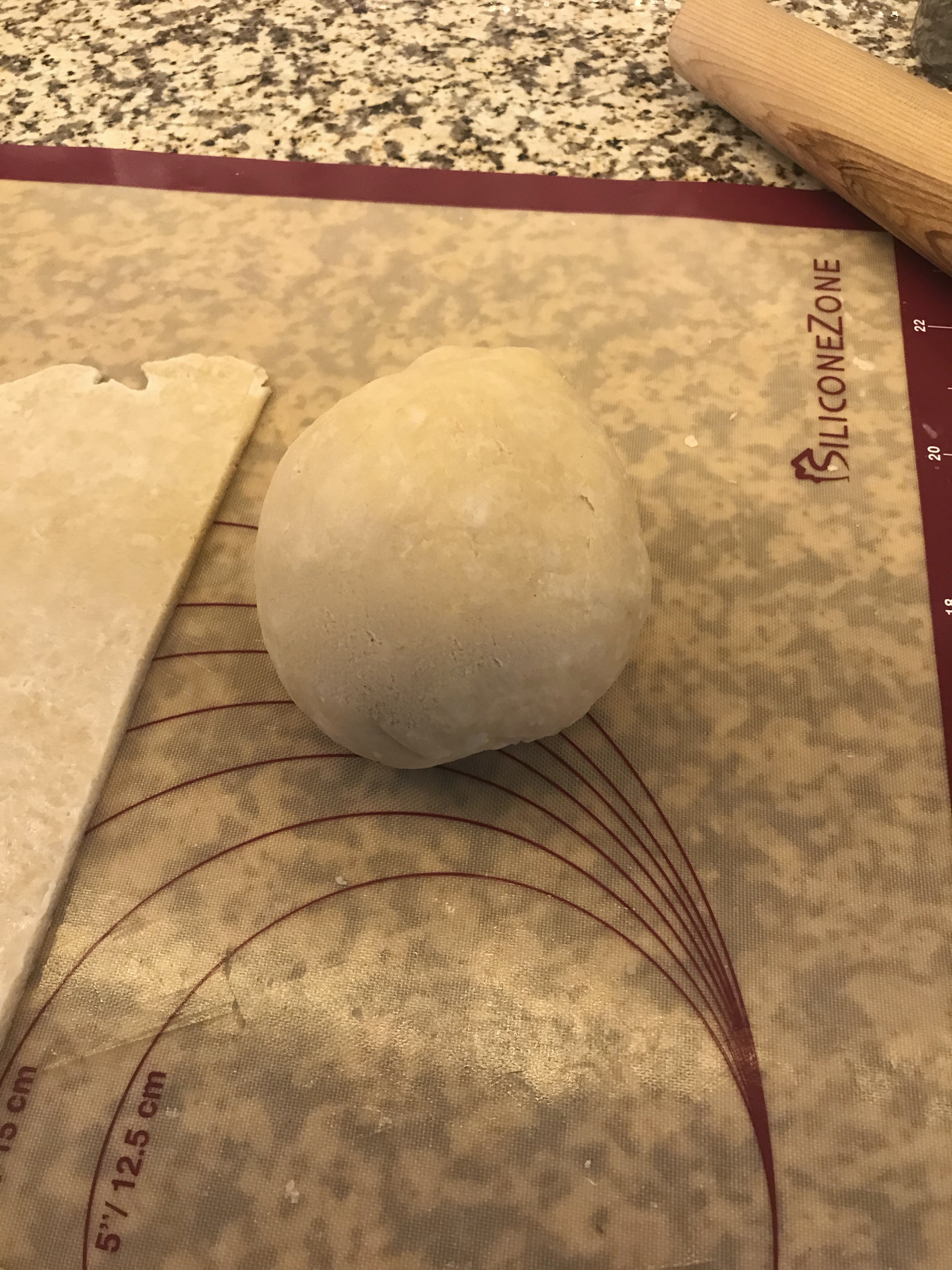
The crust is wrapped around the apples and the seams sealed to form the dumpling

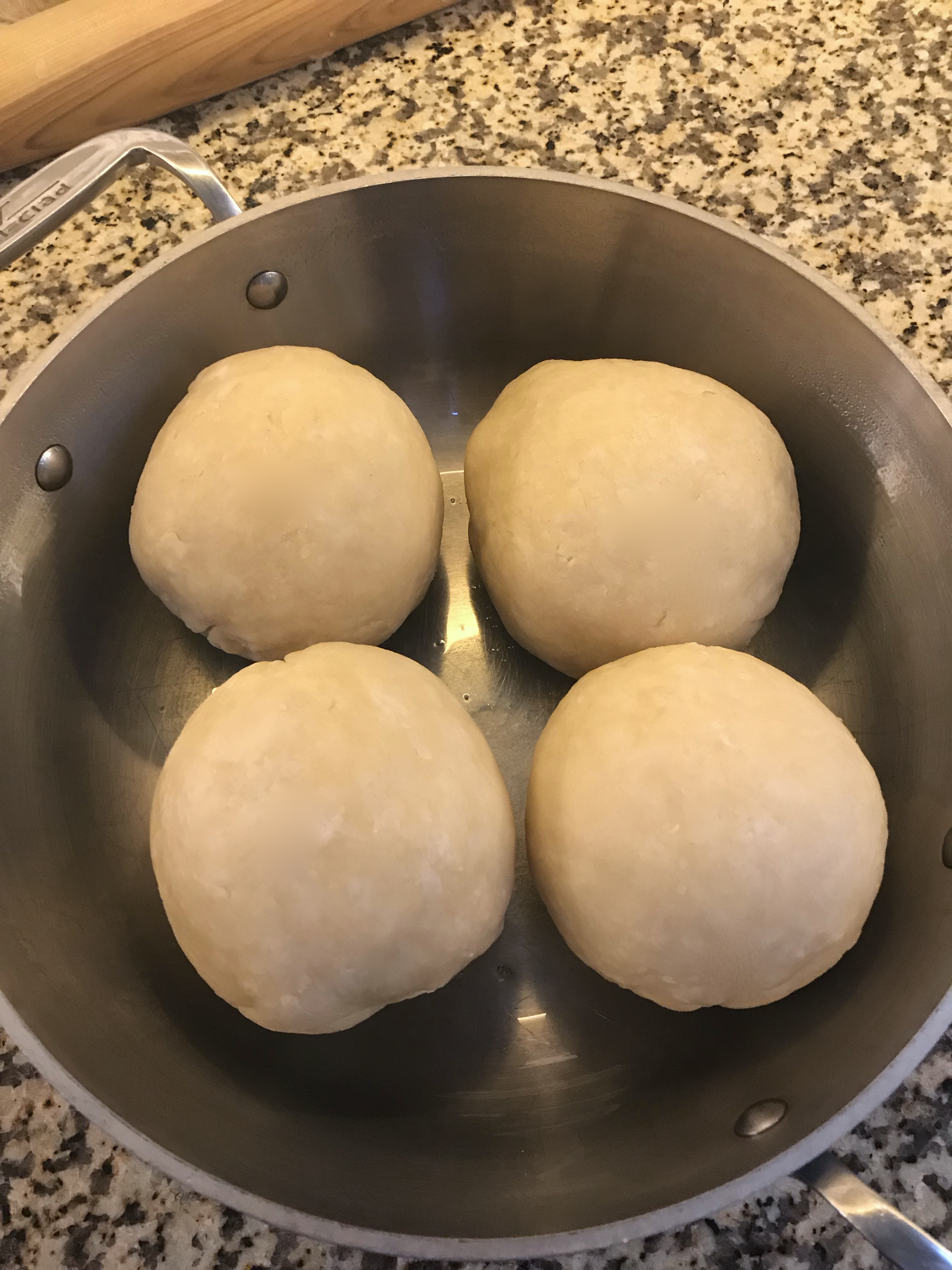
Dumplings are placed in a pan

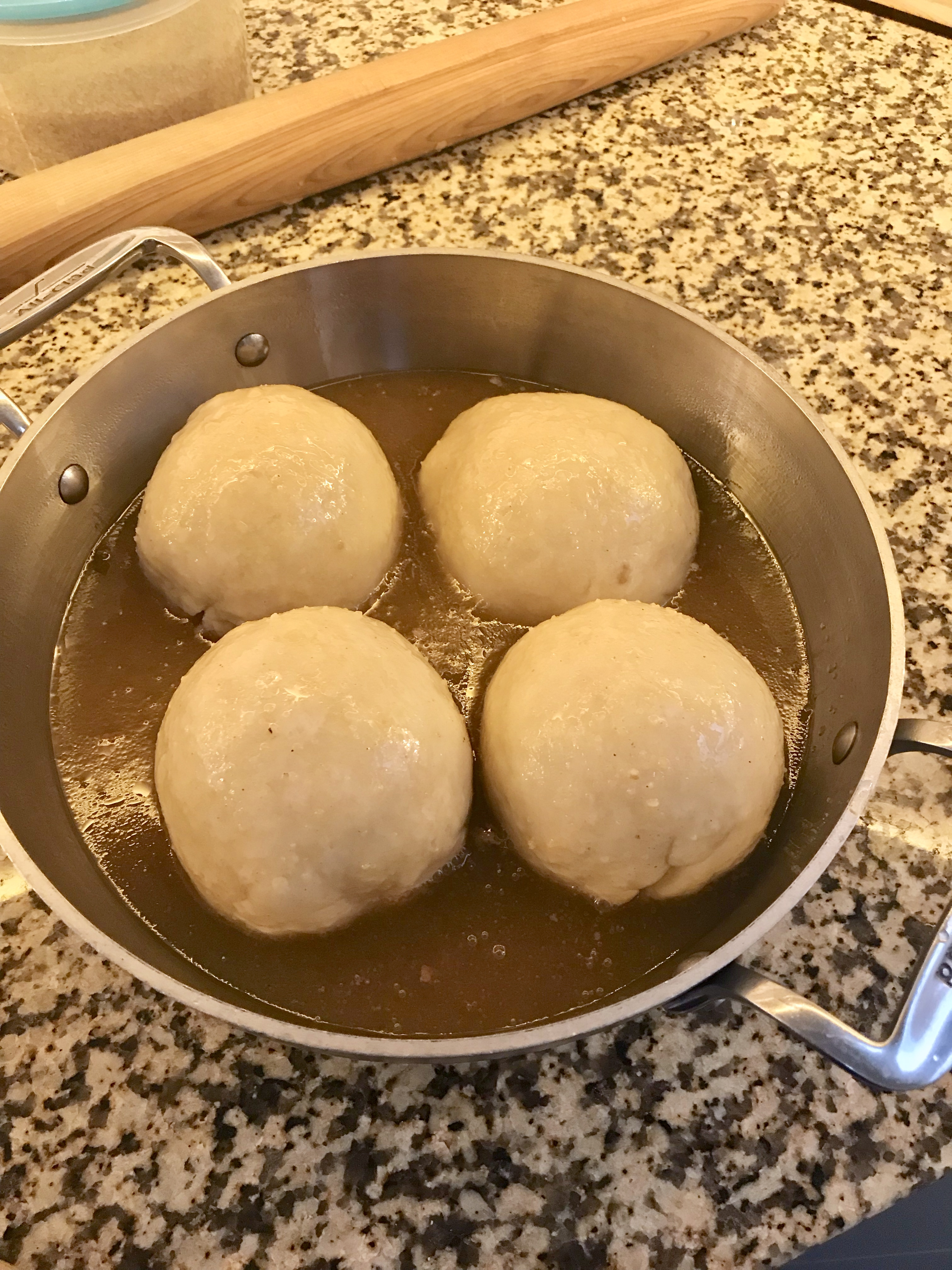
A spiced sauce is poured over the dumplings

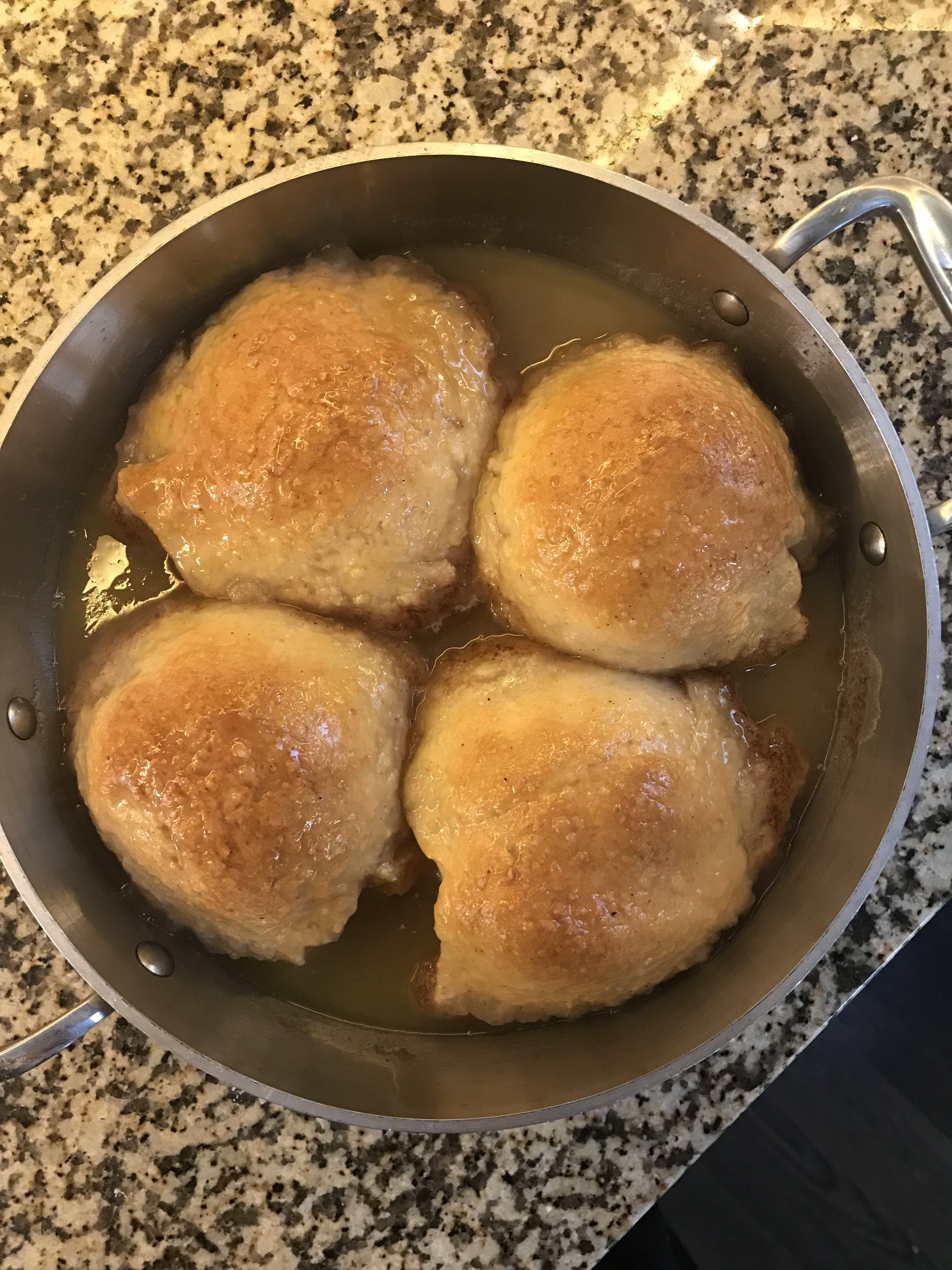
Dish is baked in a moderate oven

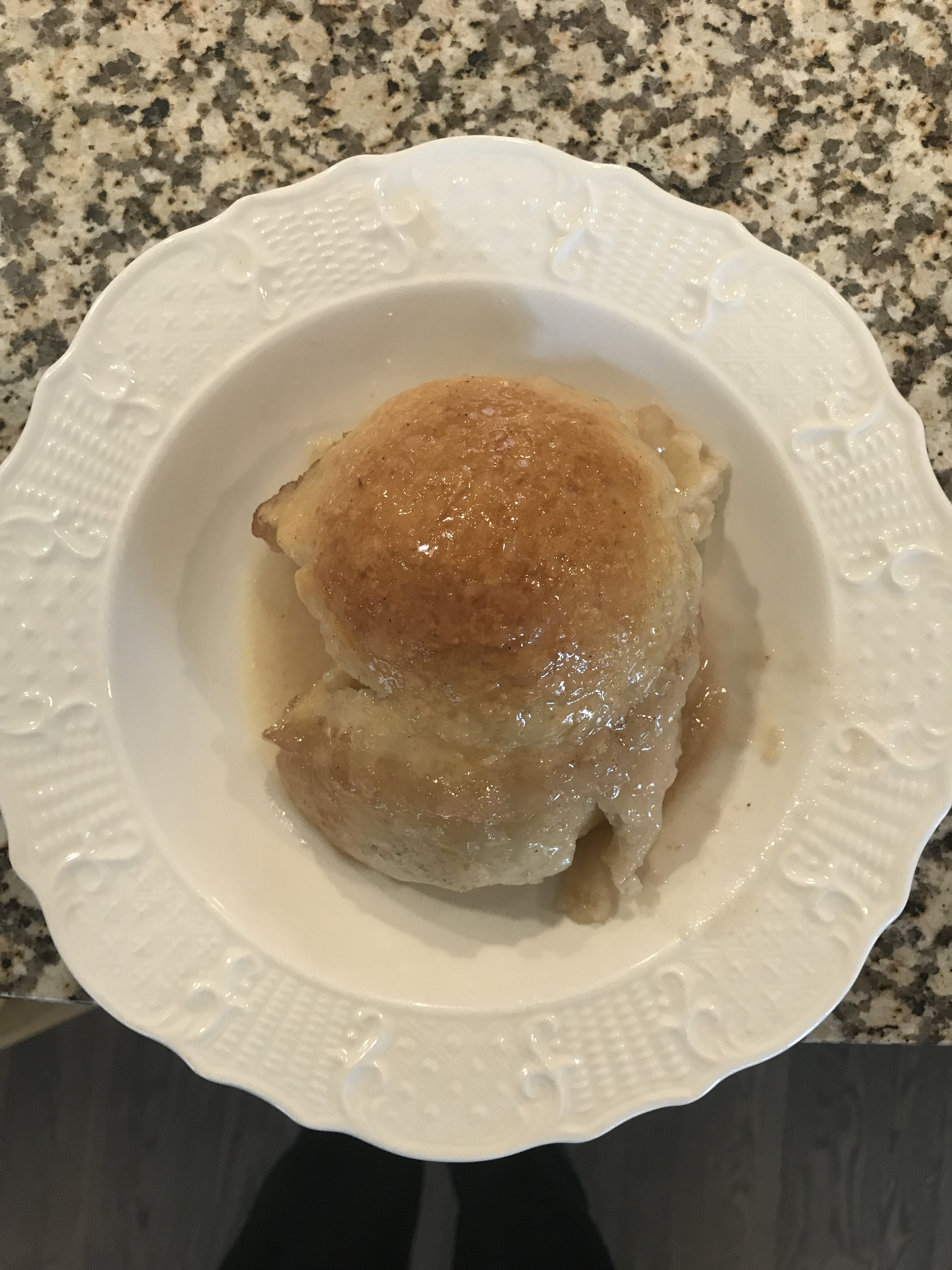
Each dumpling forms an individual serving
Preparation of boiled dumplings

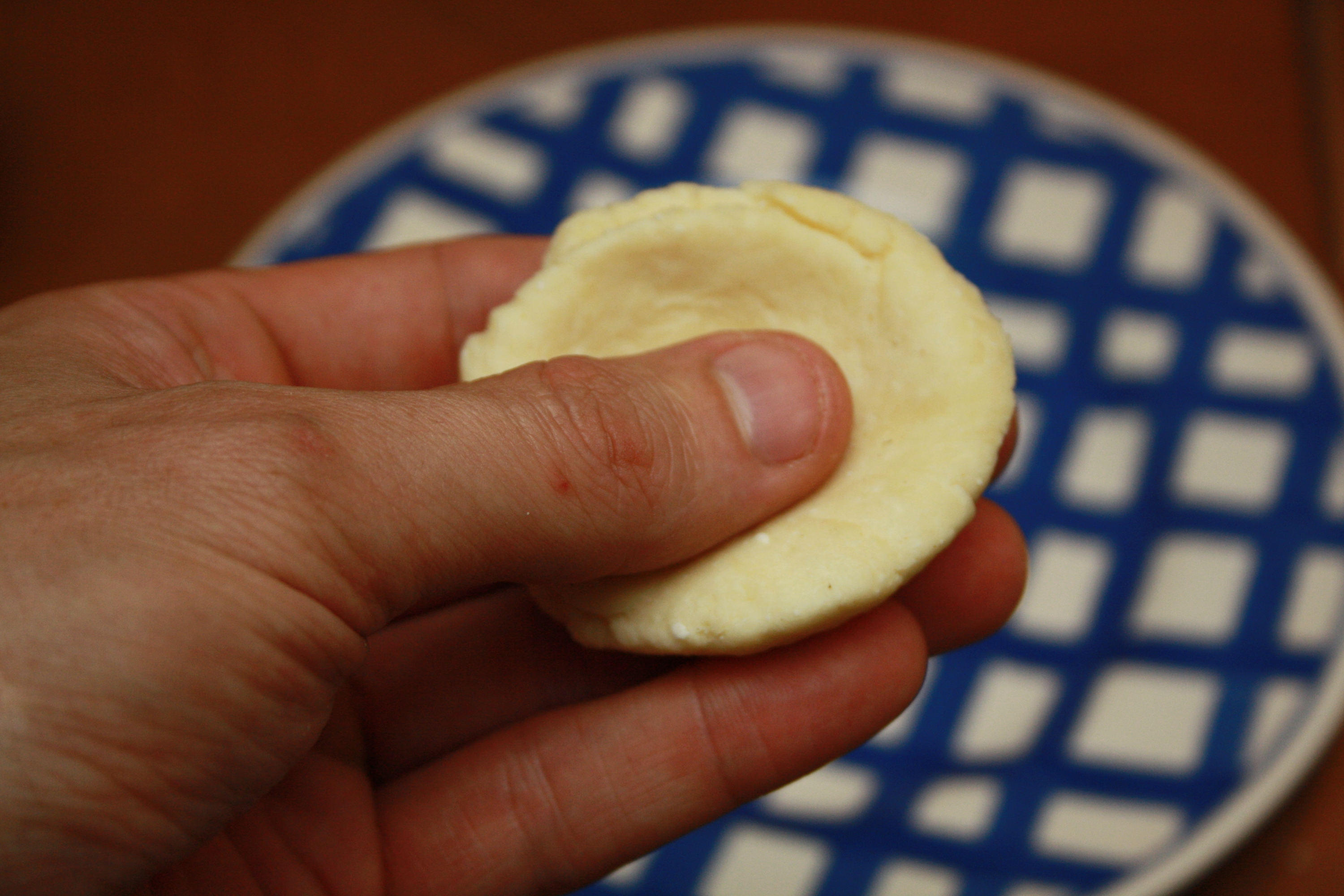
A portion of dough is flattened

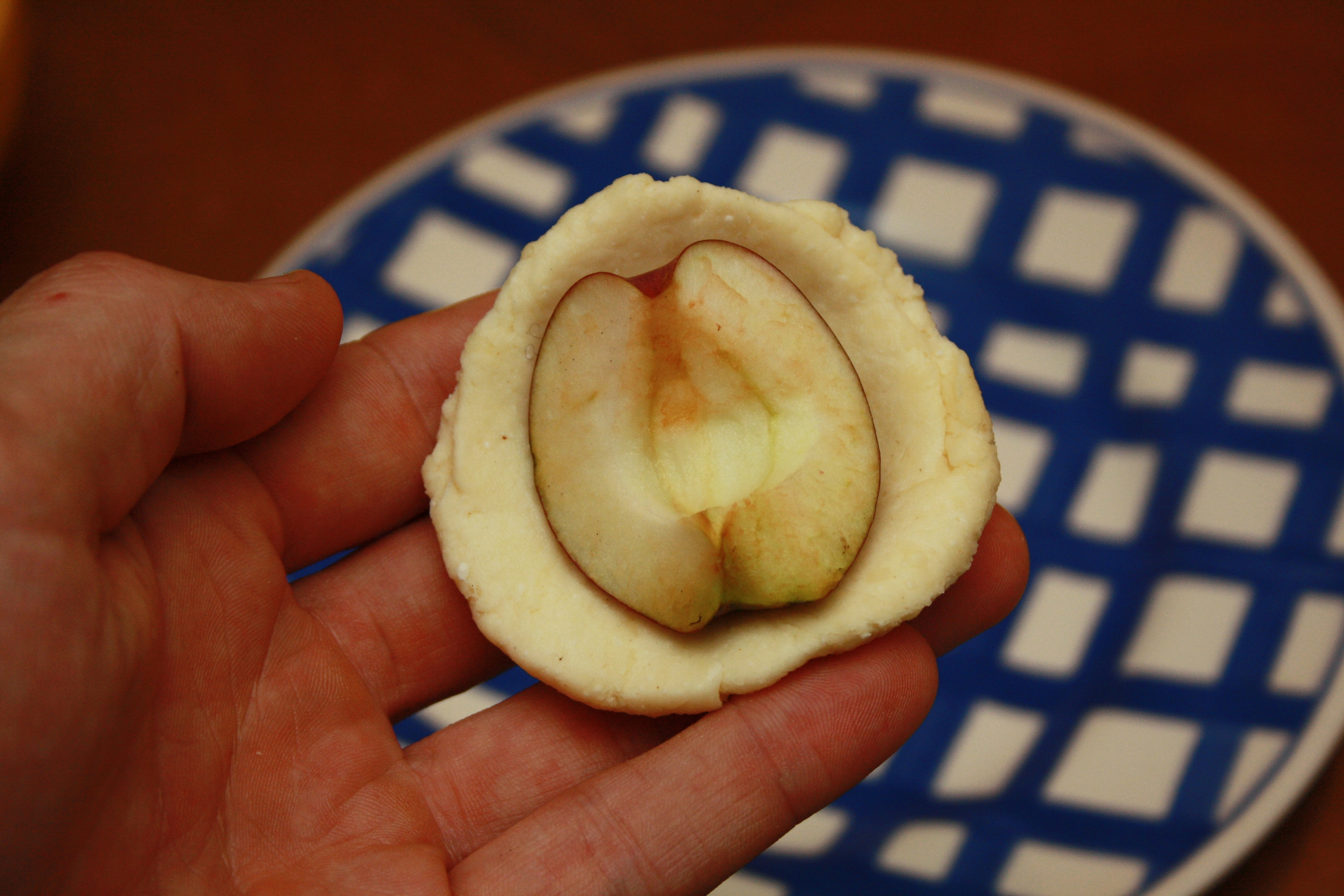
The fruit is pressed into the dough

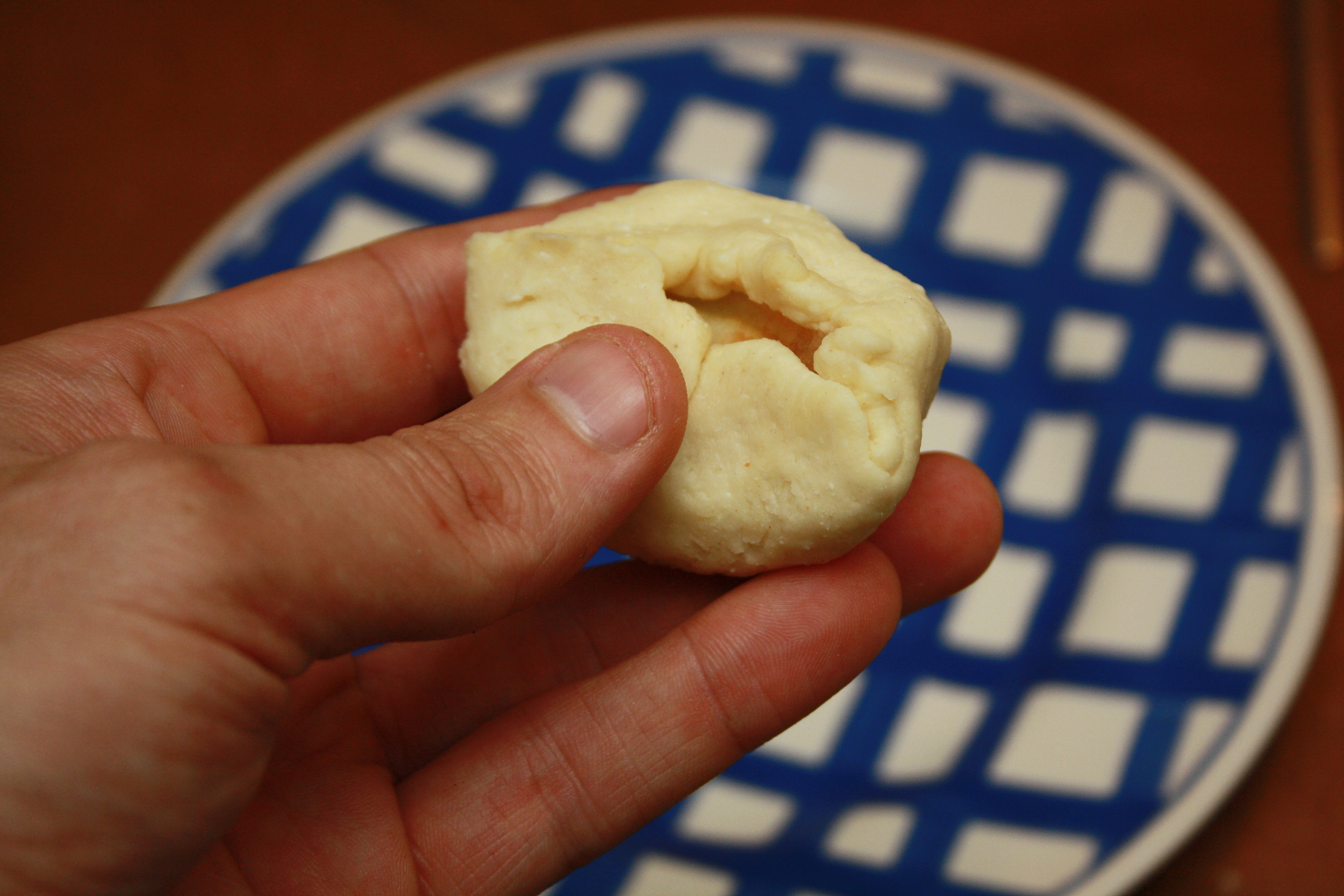
The dough is wrapped around the fruit

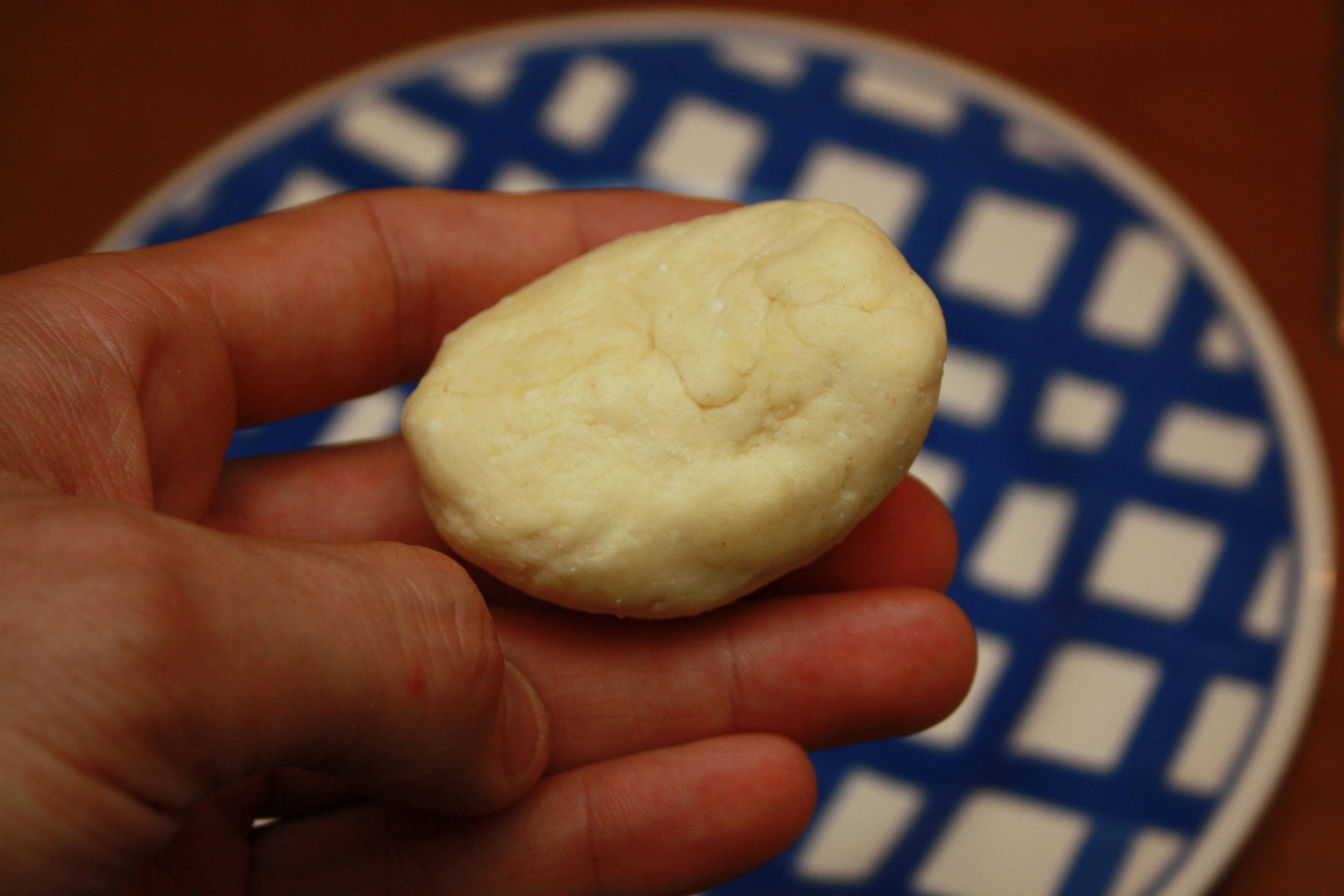
The seam is sealed

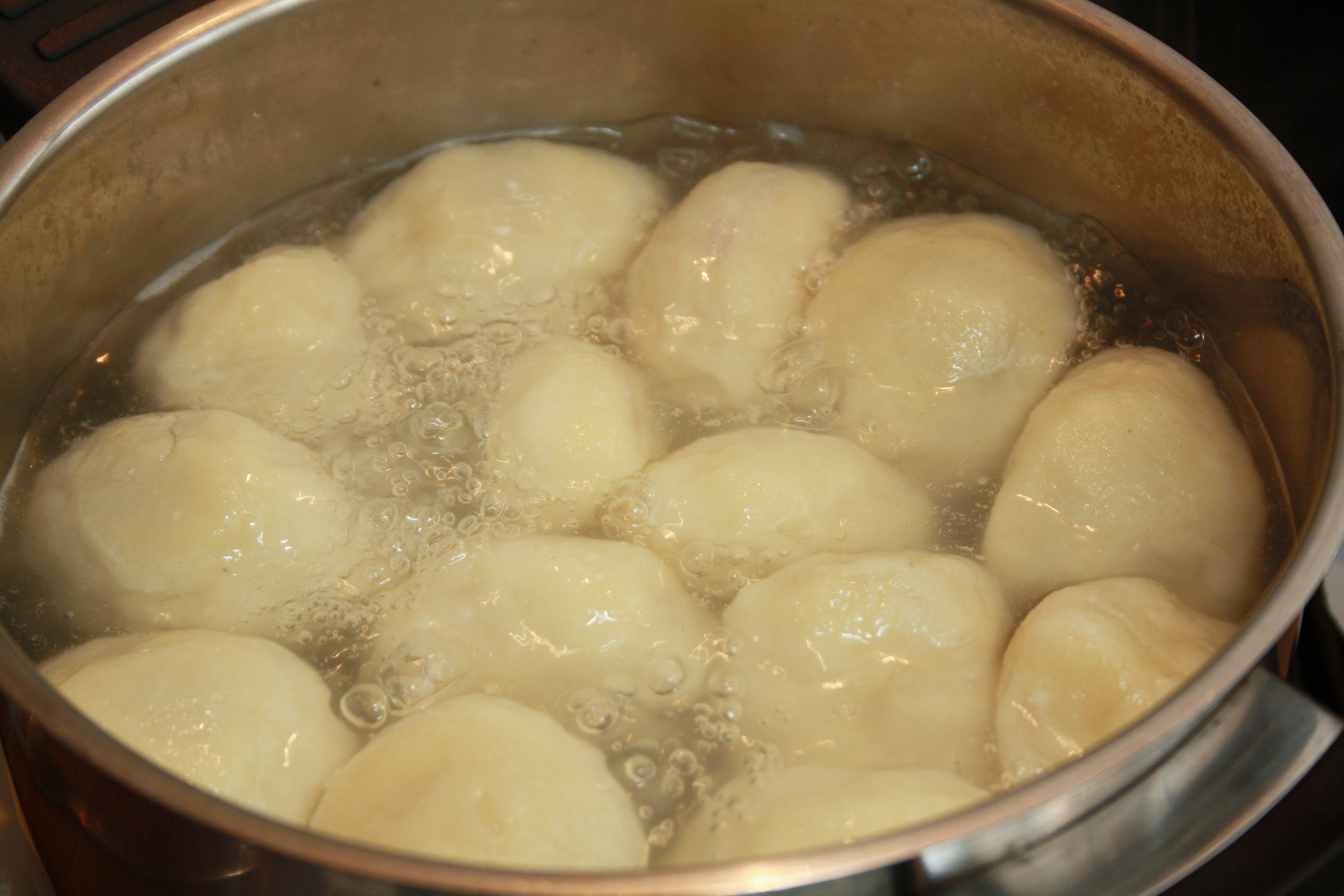
The dumplings are boiled

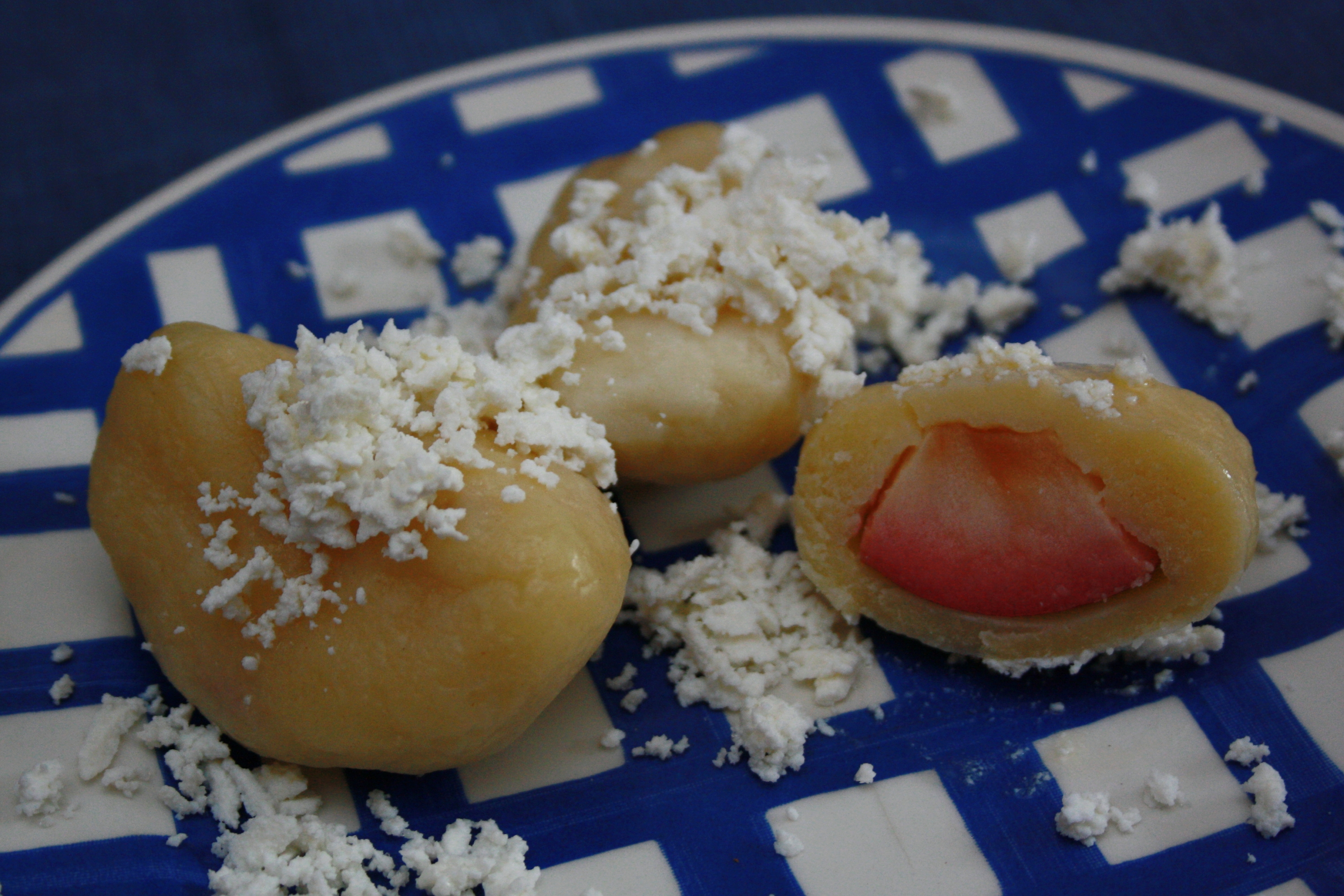
Dumplings are served with cottage cheese or other toppings

== Serving ==
Apple dumplings are served for breakfast or other meals, as sides, or as dessert. They are served hot, warm or at room temperature, sometimes with milk, cream, whipped cream, custard, or ice cream. Each dumpling is an individual serving.

== Around the world ==
=== Austria ===
In Austria a "large, soft" apple dumpling called apfelnockerln is eaten.

=== Czech Republic ===
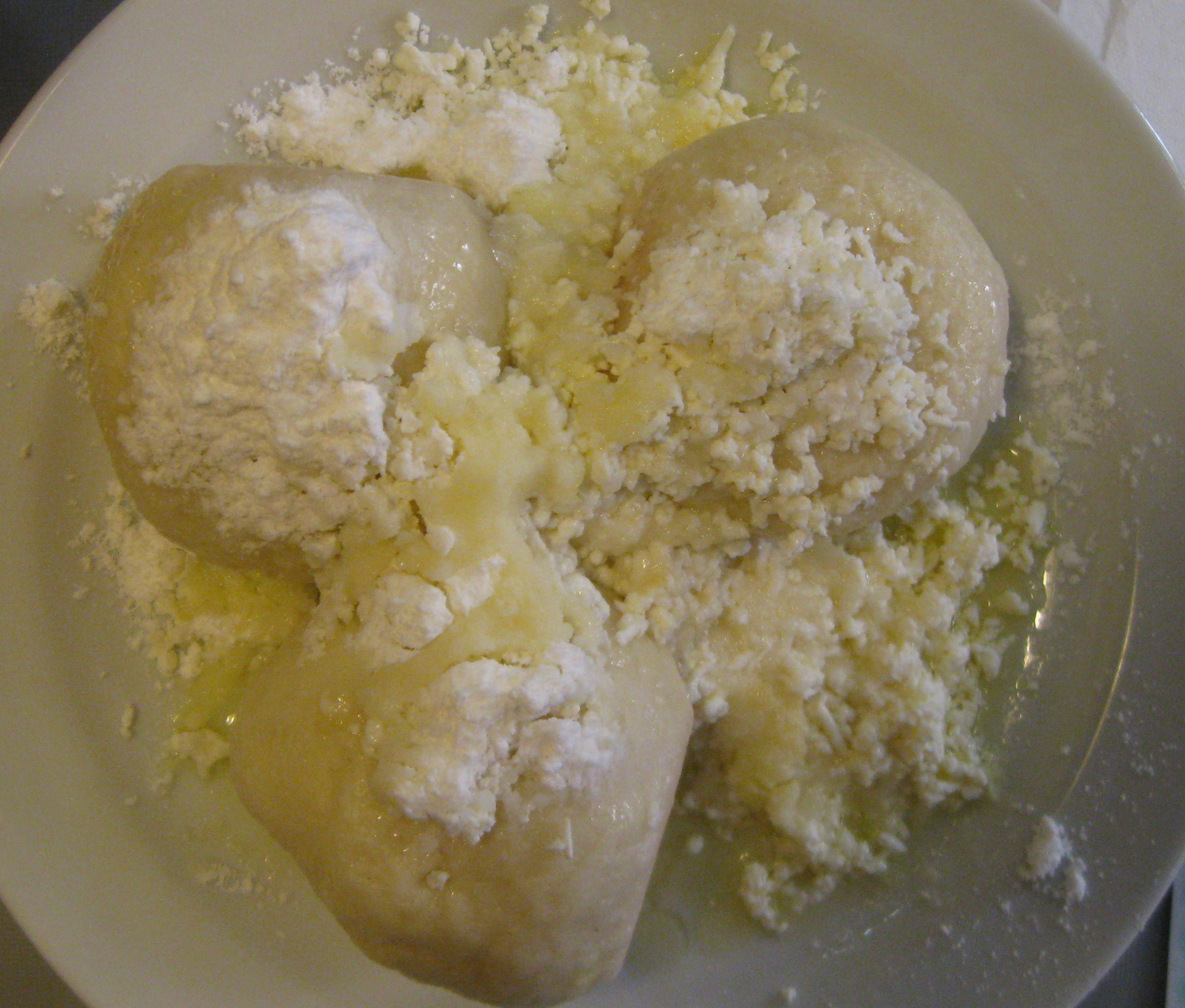
Czech dumplings served with cottage cheese, sugar and melted butter

Fruit dumplings, including apple, called ovocné knedlíky, are popular in Czech cuisine and are eaten with quark or tvaroh cheese. They are often served as a complete meal.

=== Germany ===
Apfelklöße are a "small pudding of apples," cored and filled with jam or marmalade and sometimes raisins or nuts, wrapped in pastry, boiled, and topped with a sweetened sauce containing raisins, sugar, cinnamon, and wine, a dish known since at least 1801.

=== United Kingdom ===
In the UK a suet pastry is often used, although shortcrust is also common. In one traditional recipe described by George Orwell as "one of the best forms of suet pudding," the cavity left by removal of the core is filled with brown sugar, a suet pastry crust is applied, and the dumpling is tied tightly in cloth and then boiled.

=== United States ===
Apple dumplings are a common food in the northeastern United States, especially around Pennsylvania, where they are considered a "cultural staple". Food historians trace this type of apple dumpling back to Glasse's book. A common recipe among the Pennsylvania Dutch, it is often eaten as a breakfast item or dessert. It is sometimes served with cream, whipped cream, or ice cream.

In the US, September 17 is National Apple Dumpling Day. Annual apple dumpling festivals are held in the towns of Atwood, Illinois, Stuart, Virginia, and Sinking Spring, Pennsylvania.

Jane Cunningham Croly published a 19th-century recipe for apple dumplings contributed to Jennie June's American Cookery Book by the American poet sisters Alice Cary and Phoebe Cary:

Peel and core large greening apples, of a uniform size, and fill the cavity with clear lemon marmalade. Enclose each one in a nice paste, rolled rather thin, and draw small knitted clothes over them, which give them a very pretty effect. Tie them close and boil three quarters of an hour, or an hour, if the crust is made with suet. Serve with hard sauce, flavored with nutmeg.

== Similar dishes ==
Other fruits, in particular plums, can also be used to make similar dumplings. In Austria dumplings stuffed with plums are called Zwetschkenknödel, and in Hungary dumplings these are called szilvás gombóc. Slovenian cuisine includes a similar plum dumpling dish. Czech cuisine includes a dumpling filled with plums, apricots, strawberries or blueberries. Croatian cuisine includes knedle sa šljivama, a plum dumpling with a potato dough, usually eaten as a dessert. Marillenknödel are an Austrian apricot dumpling popular in Graz.

=== Baked apples ===
Baked apples are a dish similar to baked apple dumplings but without the pastry shell. Unpeeled apples are cored and stuffed with fillings such as raisins, nuts, oatmeal, or other ingredients and spices. Variants can be served as adessert, side dish or breakfast.

== See also ==
- The Apple Dumpling Gang
- Dumpling
