= Cooking of apples =

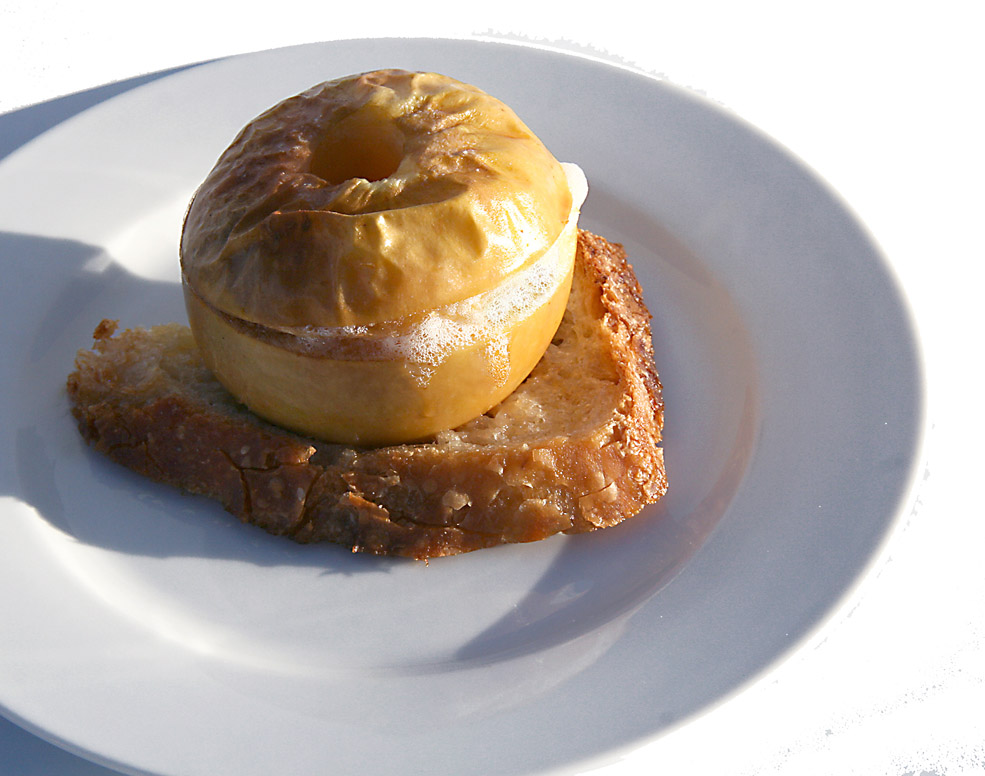
A cooked apple (Gloire de Hollande cultivar)

The cooking of apples, which softens them and changes their flavor, is the base of numerous culinary preparations. Cooked apples are said to be easier to digest than raw apples. Many varieties of cooking apples exist.

== See also ==
- Baked apple
- German baked apples
