= Tufahije =

Poached apple dessert

Tufahija
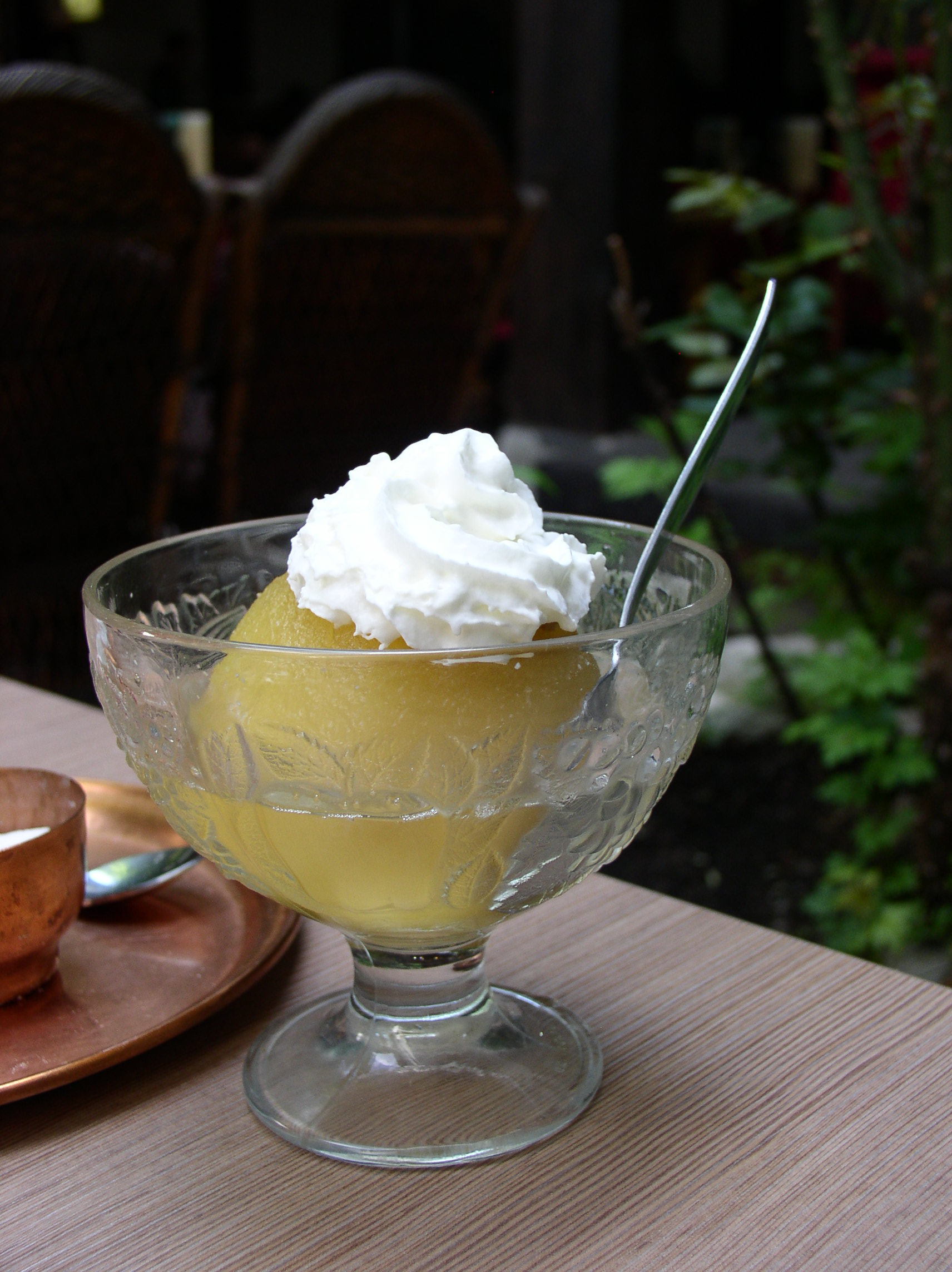
- Tufahija with whipped cream
- Type: Dessert
- Region or state: Balkans
- Main ingredients: Walnuts, apples, water, sugar

Tufahije (singular: tufahija) is a dessert made of walnut-stuffed apples poached in sugar water. It is very popular in Bosnia and Herzegovina, Croatia, Serbia, and Bulgaria.

The Bulgarian pechani yabalki are also stuffed with walnuts, but are usually baked, not poached.

== Serving ==
Tufahije is served in large glasses with their own glazed syrup and whipped cream on top. It is usually accompanied by coffee.

== Gallery ==
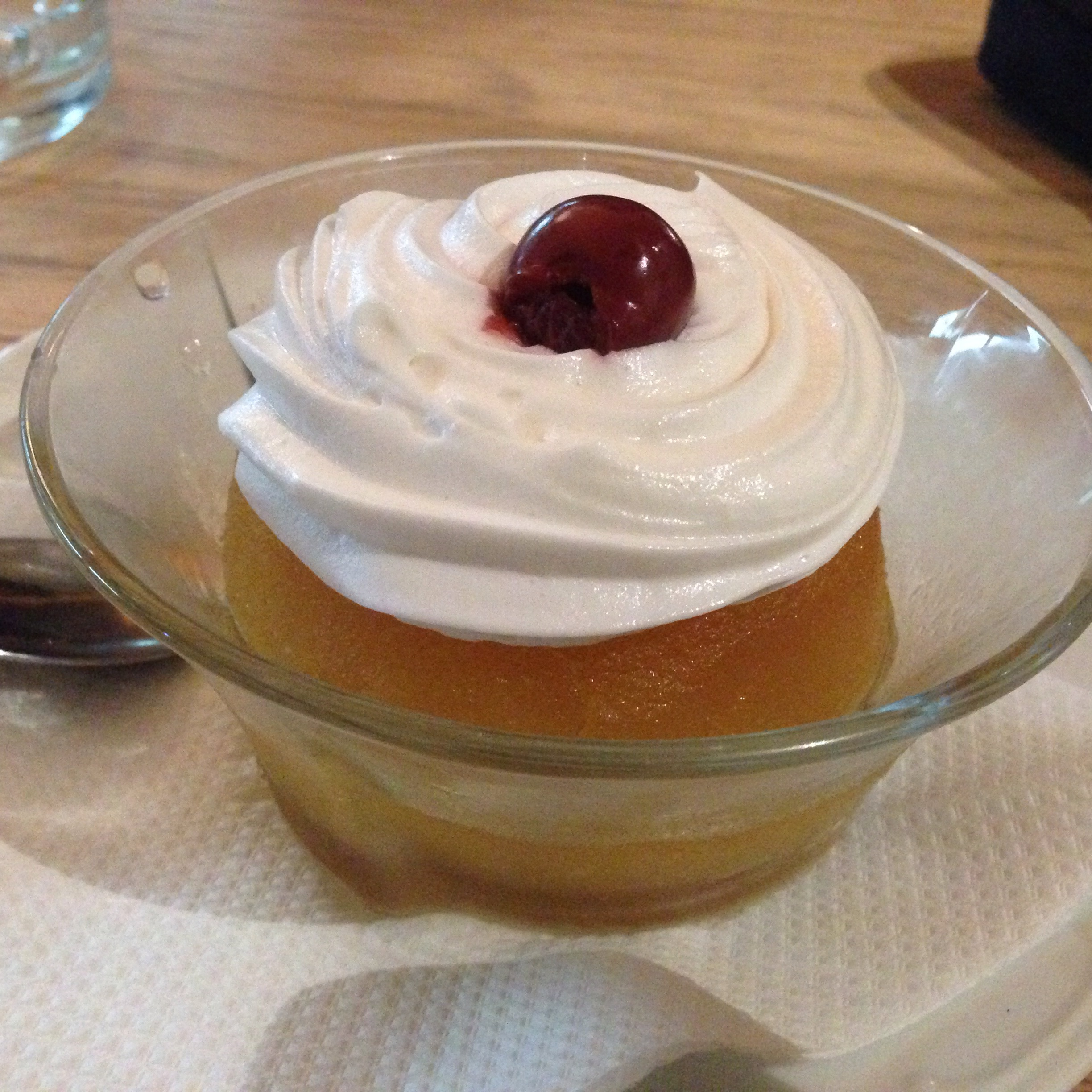
Tufahija served with cherry on the top

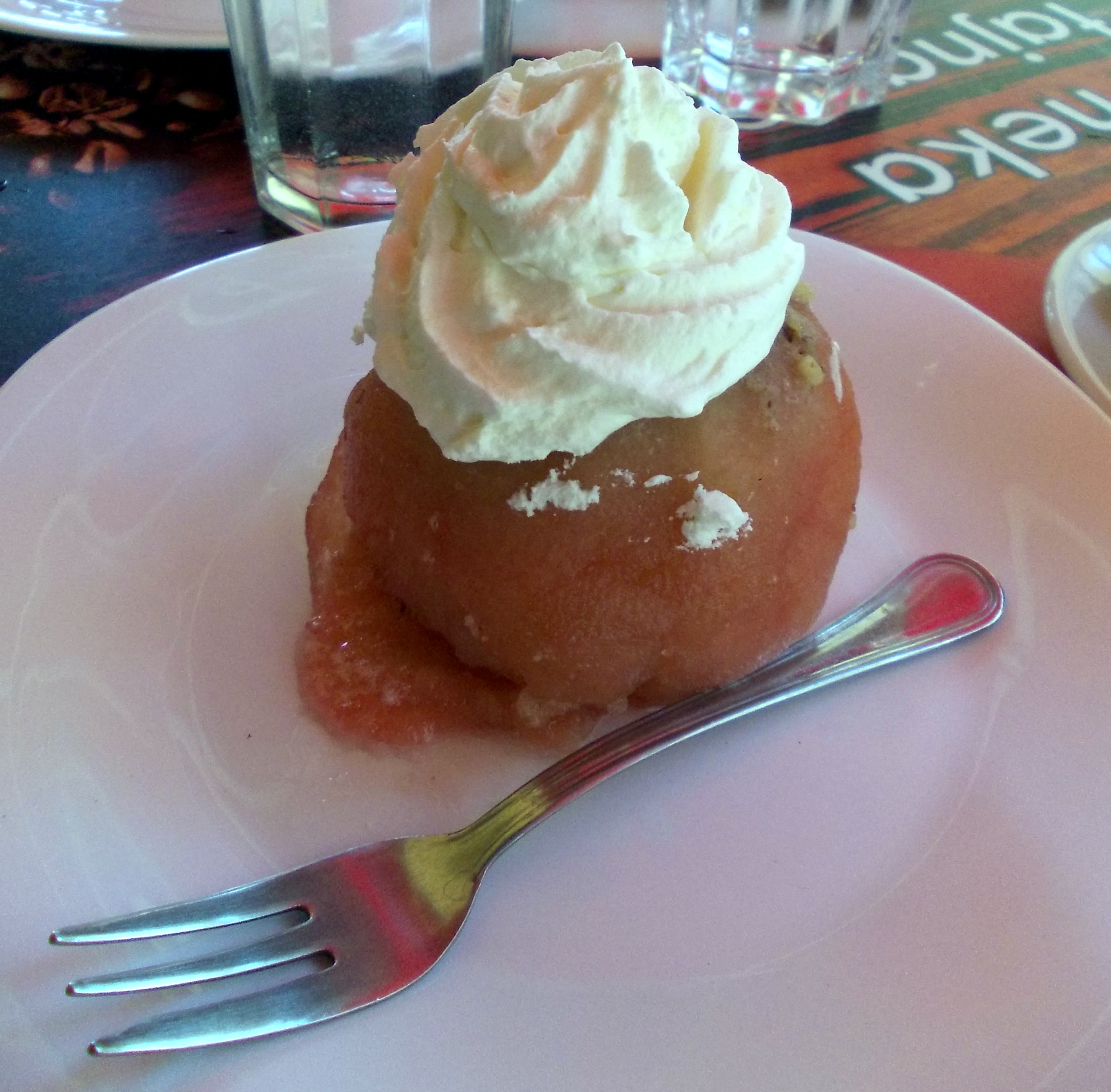
Tufahija from Mostar

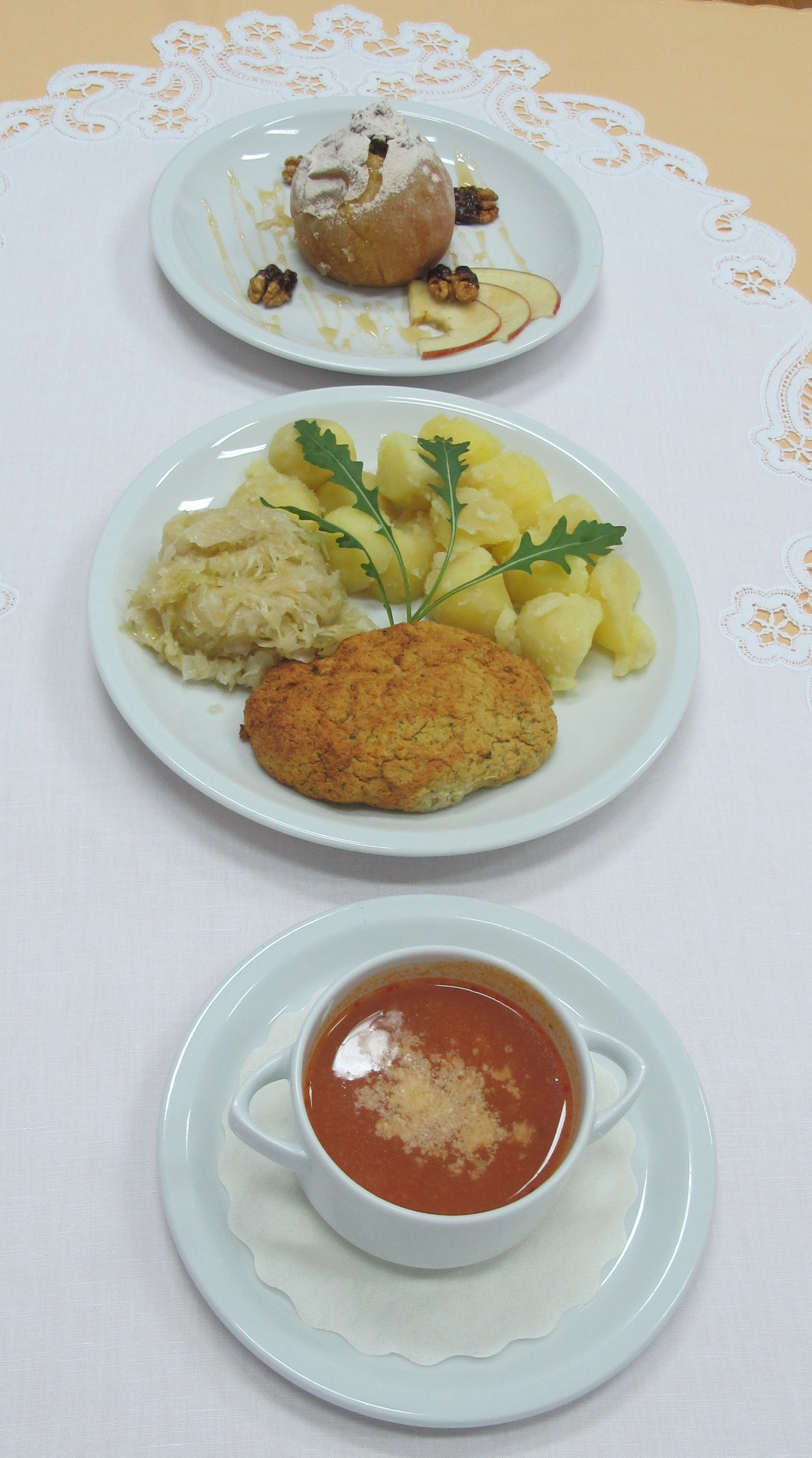
Tufahija served with soup and meat loaf

== See also ==
- Baked apple
- List of apple dishes
- List of desserts
- List of stuffed dishes
