= Oven temperatures =

Common oven temperatures (such as terms: cool oven, very slow oven, slow oven, moderate oven, hot oven, fast oven, etc.) are set to control the effects of baking in an oven, for various lengths of time.

== Standard phrases ==
Table of equivalent oven temperatures
Description	°F	°C
Cool oven	200 °F	90 °C
Very slow oven	250 °F	120 °C
Slow oven	300–325 °F	150–160 °C
Moderately slow	325–350 °F	160–180 °C
Moderate oven	350–375 °F	180–190 °C
Moderately hot	375–400 °F	190–200 °C
Hot oven	400–450 °F	200–230 °C
Very hot oven	450–500 °F	230–260 °C
Fast oven	450–500 °F	230–260 °C

The various standard phrases, to describe oven temperatures, include words such as "cool" to "hot" or "very slow" to "fast". For example, a cool oven has temperature set to 200 °F (93 °C), and a slow oven has a temperature range of 300–325 °F (149–163 °C). A moderate oven has a range of 350–375 °F (177–191 °C), and a hot oven has temperature set to 400–450 °F (204–232 °C). A fast oven has a range of 450–500 °F (232–260 °C) for the typical temperature.

== Estimating oven temperature ==
Before ovens had thermometers or thermostats, these standard words were used by cooks and cookbooks to describe how hot an oven should be to cook various items. Custards require a slow oven for example, bread a moderate oven, and pastries a very hot oven. Cooks estimated the temperature of an oven by counting the number of minutes it took to turn a piece of white paper golden brown, or counting the number of seconds one could hold one's hand in the oven. Another method was to put a layer of flour or a piece of white tissue paper on a pan in the oven for five minutes. The resulting colors range from delicate brown in a slow oven through golden brown in a moderate oven to dark brown in a hot oven.

== See also ==
- Conversion of units
- Gas mark
- SI Units
