= Apple chip =

Food

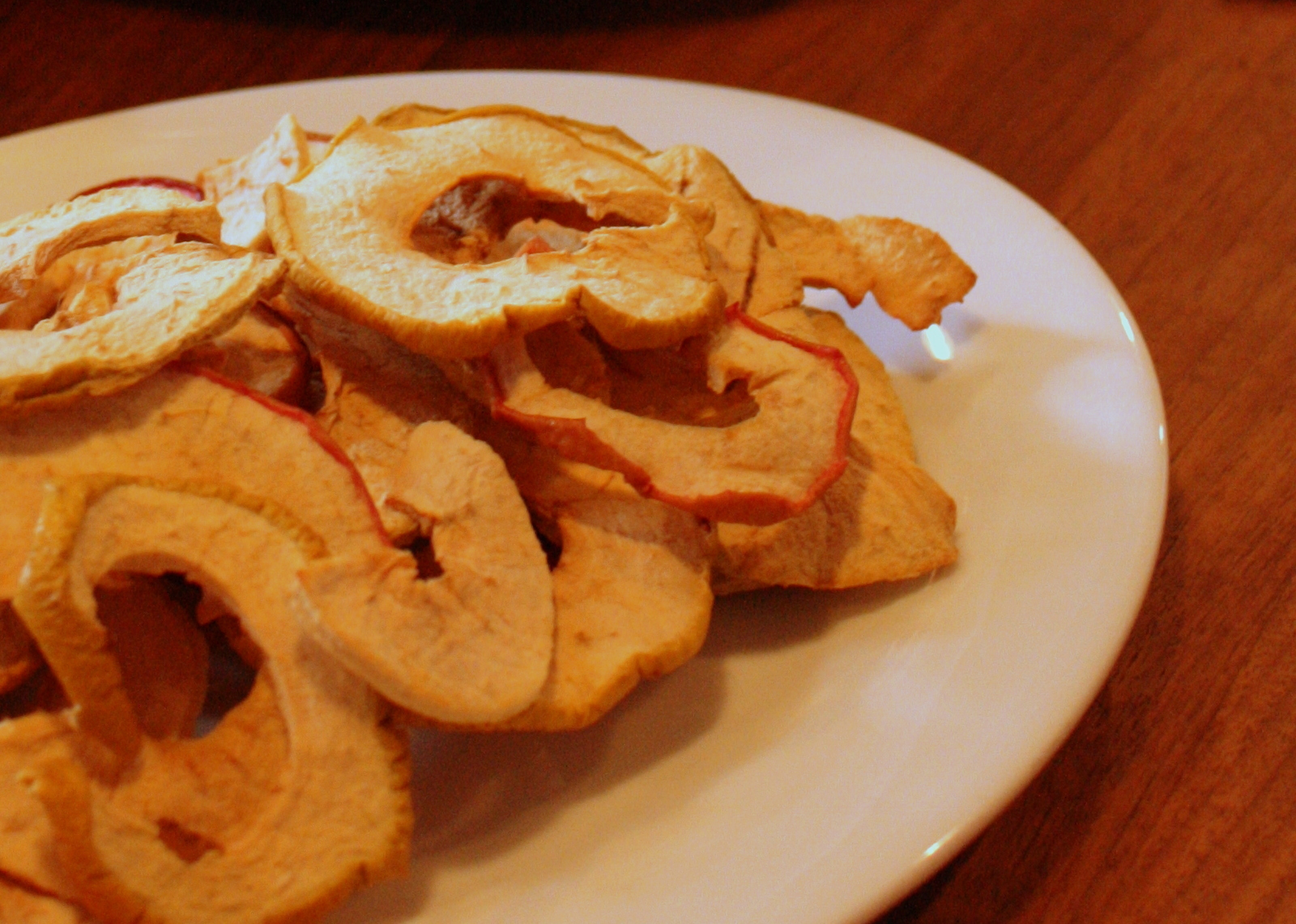
Dried apple chips

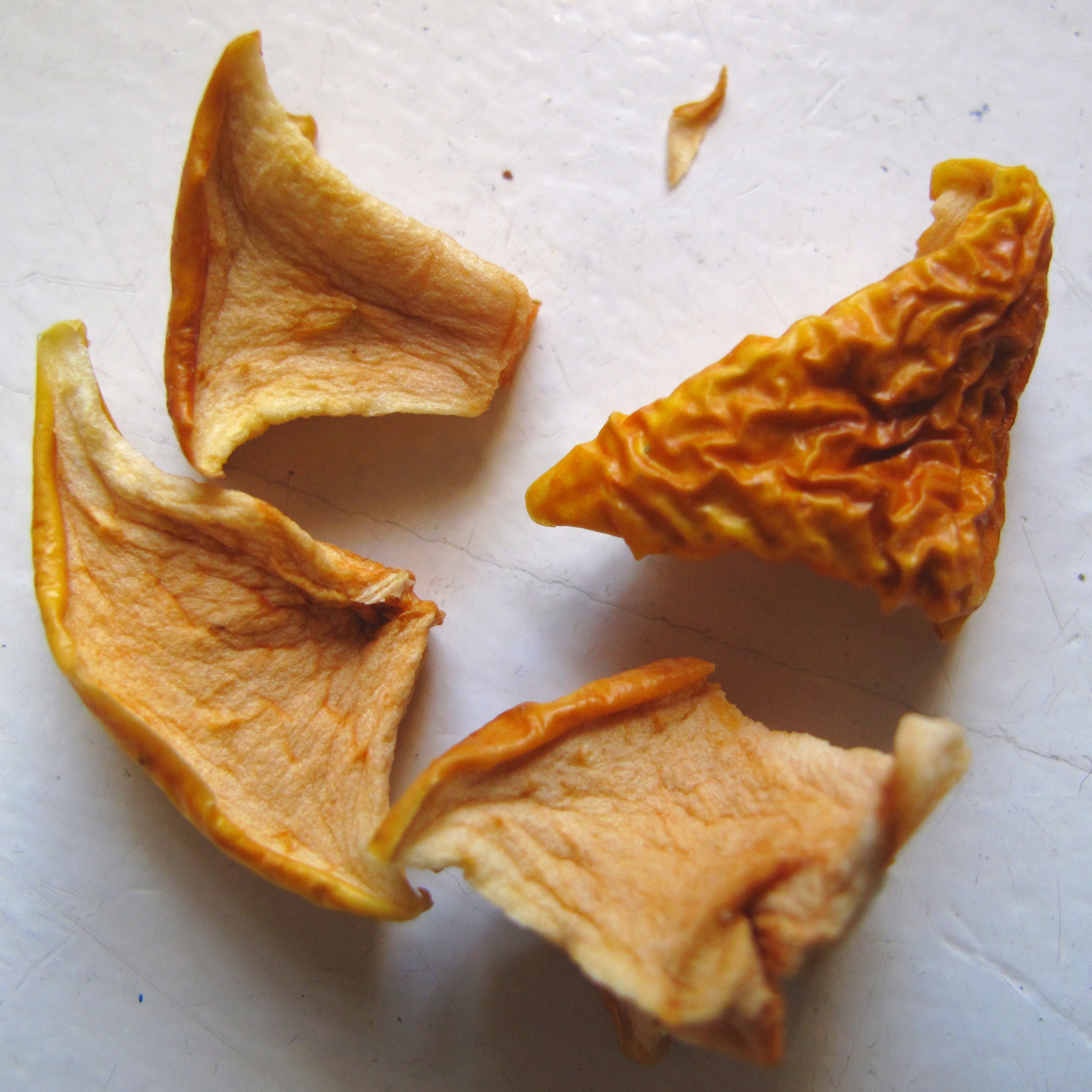
Basic dehydrated apple chips

Apple chips are chips or crisps that are prepared using apples. Depending on how they are produced, apple chips may either become drier and crispier, or chewier, when stale. Apple chips may be fried, deep fried, vacuum fried, dehydrated or baked. Apple chips may have a dense and crispy texture or may be puffed, yet still crispy. Microwave vacuum-drying may be used to prepare apple chips with a puffy and crispy texture. They may be seasoned with cinnamon and sweetened with confectioners sugar. Apple chips may be consumed as a snack food, and may be accompanied by various dips and other foods. Apple chips are mass-produced in the United States.

== Use in dishes ==
Apple chips may be used in sandwiches and as an ingredient in desserts and sweets, such as cookies. They may also be used as a garnish on dishes.

== Manufacturers ==
Apple chips are mass-produced by some food manufacturers. Companies that produce them include Seneca Foods, Bare Fruit, Buddy Fruits and Tyrrell's. Bare Fruit and Buddy Fruits apple chips are prepared using only apples as their sole ingredient.

== Fried ==
Apple chips can also be made by deep frying a sliced apple in a batter. Usually, the batter will also be topped with cinnamon before or after the frying process. The usual shape of a deep-fried apple chip is a ring. Fried Apple chips can also be made in a pan.

== See also ==
- Banana chip
- List of apple dishes
- List of deep fried foods
- List of dried foods
