= Calvados Roger Groult =

Brandy produced in France

Calvados Roger Groult is a brand of calvados brandy produced at Clos de la Hurvanière, located in Saint-Cyr-du-Ronceray in Normandy (France), in the Pays d'Auge, noted for its ciders and Calvados. In 2025 it won the title of World’s Best Calvados at the World Calvdos Awards.

== History ==
The Groult family moved to the Clos de la Hurvanière in the 18th century. Pierre Groult (1830–1918) began to distill cider around 1850. Pierre Groult expanded production by purchasing a pot still and building a cellar. He also began to bottle the Calvados; previously it had only been sold in casks as was common practice at the time. Upon succeeding his father, Leon Groult (1874-1923) built a further aging cellar to meet the increasing demand. Roger Groult (1905–1988), son of Leon, expanded the distillery. In 1975 he established the public company "Calvados Roger Groult SA" for the production and marketing of calvados.

Once at the helm, Roger's son, Jean-Pierre Groult (1946–2008), created a company that allowed him to buy the neighbourhood apples to increase his production. He built in 1980 the two largest cellars of the area to store and age more significant amounts of calvados. This allowed him to develop the company's stocks for export and start marketing them to hotels and restaurants abroad.

Jean-Pierre Groult was succeeded in 2008 by his son Jean-Roger. Jean-Roger Groult is a founding member of a new Calvados association, Esprit Calvados. Esprit Calvados is the association of 5 family owned Calvados estates in Pays d' Auge.

== Sustainability ==
The Calvados Roger Groult SA remains an independent family company. It employs eight people.
