= Norfolk Biffin =

Apple cultivar

'Norfolk Biffin'
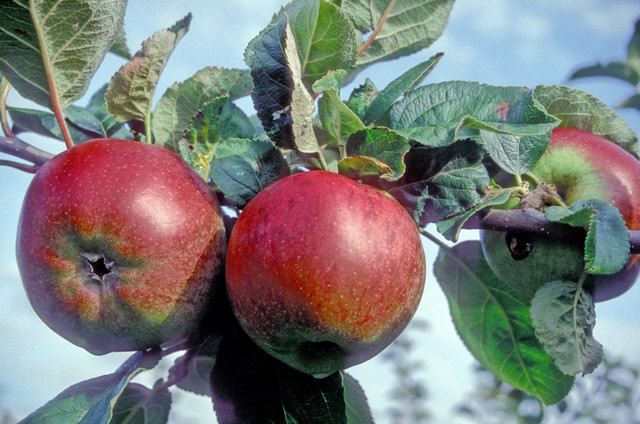
- Cultivar: 'Norfolk Biffin' ('Norfolk Beefing')
- Origin: Norfolk, England. Before 1807

The Norfolk Biffin, also spelt Norfolk Beefing, is a local apple cultivar originating from the English county of Norfolk, also known by several other names including Reeds Baker, Tallesin, and Winter Coleman.

"Biffin" is thought to be a corruption of "beefing", which refers to the apple's dark red beef-like colour, or perhaps beefing is a corruption of biffin.

== Description ==
Norfolk Biffins, or Beefings, are round, slightly flat, apples about three inches across and two and a half inches high (about seven by six centimetres). The skin is yellow-green, but with brown-purple and dark red streaks. Inside, the flesh has a green tint, is crisp, and is said to have a hint of the flavour of cinnamon. The apples store well, getting sweeter with keeping, and are good for cooking and drying. By March of the year after harvesting, they are sweet enough to use as dessert apples. With keeping, they turn a deeper brown or maroon colour, with harder, more solid flesh.

These apples were popular with Norwich bakers and were sent to London fruiterers as a delicacy. They were also used for cider making.

The trees are vigorous, with heavy crops of fruit. Some thinning is necessary in good years.

== History ==
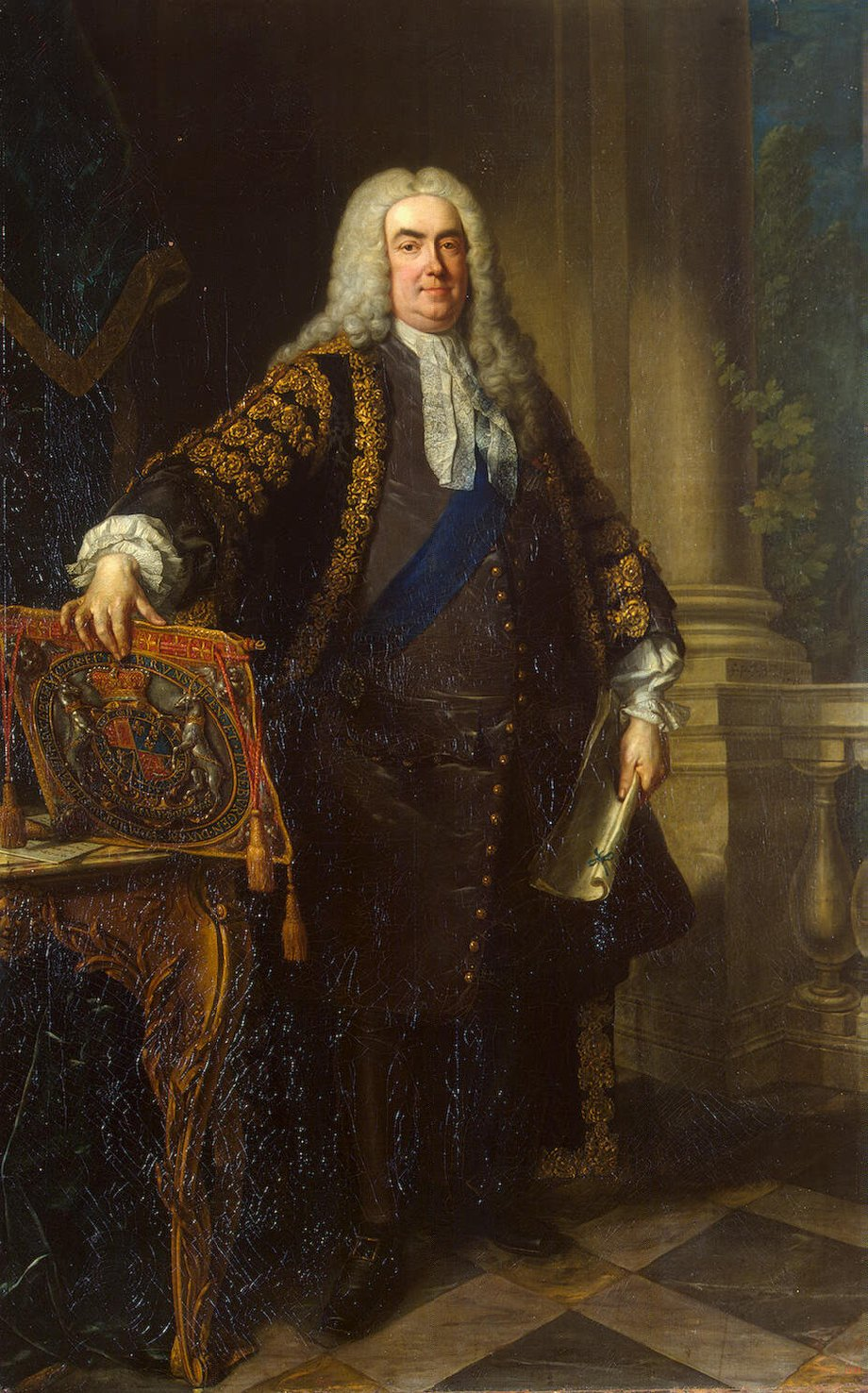
Robert Walpole, an early Norfolk Biffin admirer

The Norfolk Biffin is an apple variety grown over some three hundred years, often for drying to make 'biffins' (viz., "a baked apple flattened in the form of a cake").

The estate records for Mannington, Norfolk, dating from 1698, of Robert Walpole (later the first Prime Minister of Great Britain) mention Norfolk Biffin apples which Walpole had sent up to his house in London. The apple is documented in the United States from the 1840s.

The Norfolk Biffin is also mentioned by Charles Dickens, first in A Christmas Carol and in Martin Chuzzlewit (1843), later in Dombey and Son (1846–1848) and in Boots at the Holly-tree Inn (1858). The first of these says: "Norfolk Biffins, squab and swarthy, setting off the yellow of oranges and lemons, and in the great compactness of their juicy persons, urgently entreating and beseeching to be carried home in paper bags and eaten after dinner". The last of these has: "Cobbs, do you think you could bring a biffin, please?... I think a Norfolk biffin would rouse her, Cobbs. She is very fond of them."

The Victorian food writer and poet Eliza Acton recommends the apple in her Modern cookery, in all its branches (1845) as the best apple to use when baking 'Black Caps par Excellence' (a sugared baked apple made with wine and lemon peel): "The Norfolk biffin answers for this dish far better than any other kind of apple".

A recipe for biffins of 1882 advises: "choose Norfolk Biffins with the clearest most blemish free rinds, then lay them on clean straw on baking wire and cover well with more straw. Set them in a very slow oven for four to five hours. Draw them out and press them very gently, otherwise their skins will burst. Return them now to the oven for another hour, then press them again. When cold, rub them over with clarified sugar".

In Victorian London, there was a Christmas trade in biffins, supplied by Norwich bakers, who cooked the apples in their bread-ovens, weighed down with an iron plate to exclude air.

The apple is now only rarely seen in English orchards, having been widely replaced by such varieties as the Cox's Orange Pippin. However, it is still grown by gardeners for home consumption and the cultivar can still be bought commercially.
