= Baked fruit dessert =

Fruit dessert with a topping

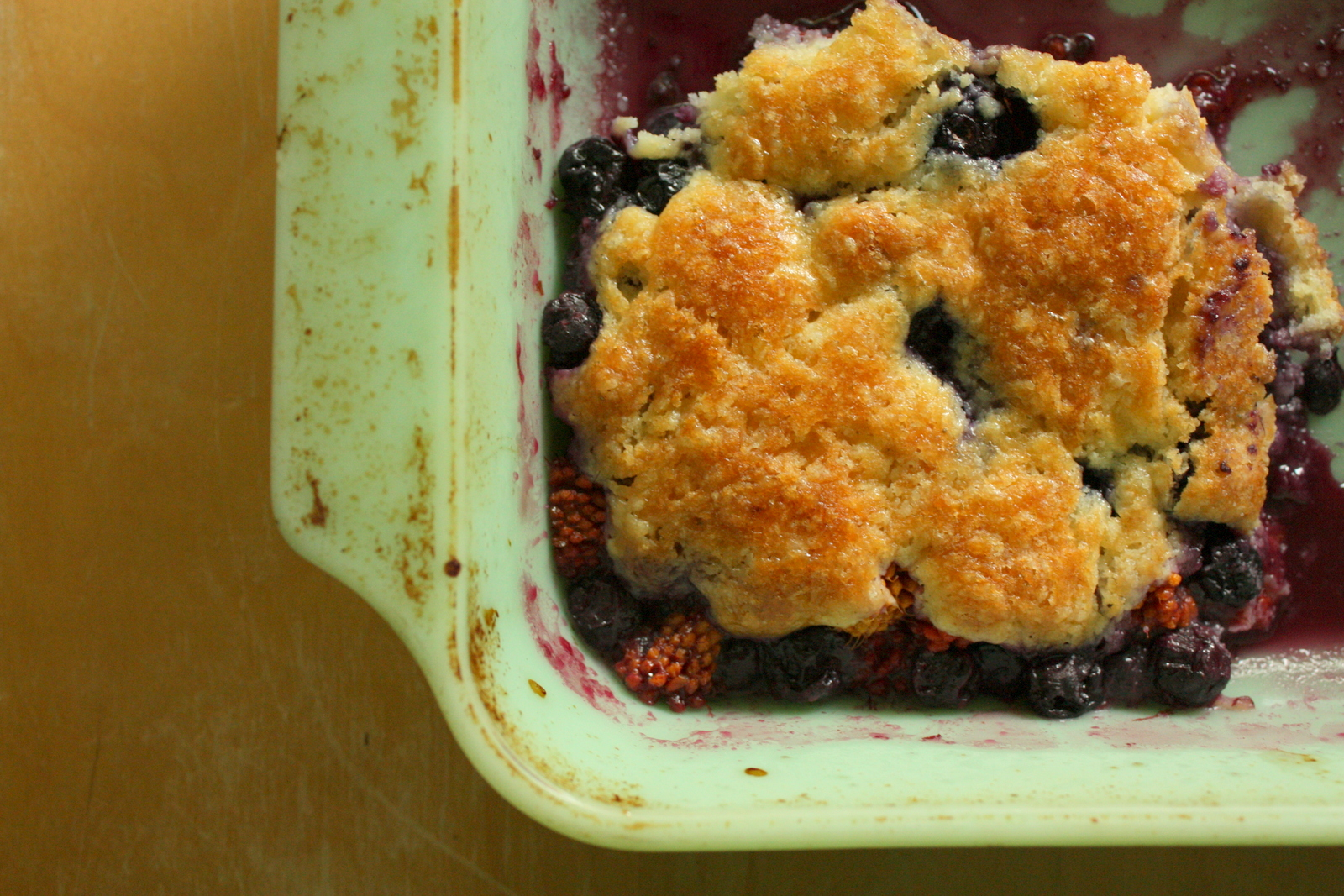
Cobbler

Baked fruit desserts, sometimes known as spoon pies, are made by adding sweetener and spice to fruit, adding a topping such as pastry or dough, and baking. They often have whimsical names, with prominent examples including the cobbler, crisp or crumble, Brown Betty, pandowdy, the slump or grunt, and the sonker. Baked fruit desserts are generally understood to be homely, unsophisticated preparations, that can be easily scaled as the number of eaters requires.

Toppings include breadcrumbs, biscuit or pastry dough, oatmeal, streusel, or nuts, with some chosen for the crunchy sensation they produce. Sweeteners and flavorings are often easily accessible, and include molasses or honey, or cinnamon and vanilla extract. Some cooks prepare more elaborate versions of baked fruit desserts. These emphasize seasonal produce, and more involved preparation, such as a layer of vanilla-infused brown butter under the topping.

The basic preparation of baked fruit desserts makes their origins unclear. They rarely appear in 19th-century cookbooks, which may be due to cooks considering them so obvious that inclusion was unnecessary. In America, some versions are associated with the New England region, which Bill Addison speculates may indicate an English origin.

== See also ==
- Apple crisp
- List of desserts
- List of fruit dishes

== Sources ==
- Addison, Bill (2015). "Fruit desserts, baked". In Goldstein, Darra (ed.). The Oxford Companion to Sugar and Sweets. Oxford: Oxford University Press. ISBN 978-0-199-31339-6.
- Patent, Greg (2002). Baking in America: Traditional and Contemporary Favorites From the Past 200 Years. Boston & New York: Houghton Mifflin Company. ISBN 0-618-04831-6.
