= Apple crisp =

Baked apple dessert with streusel topping

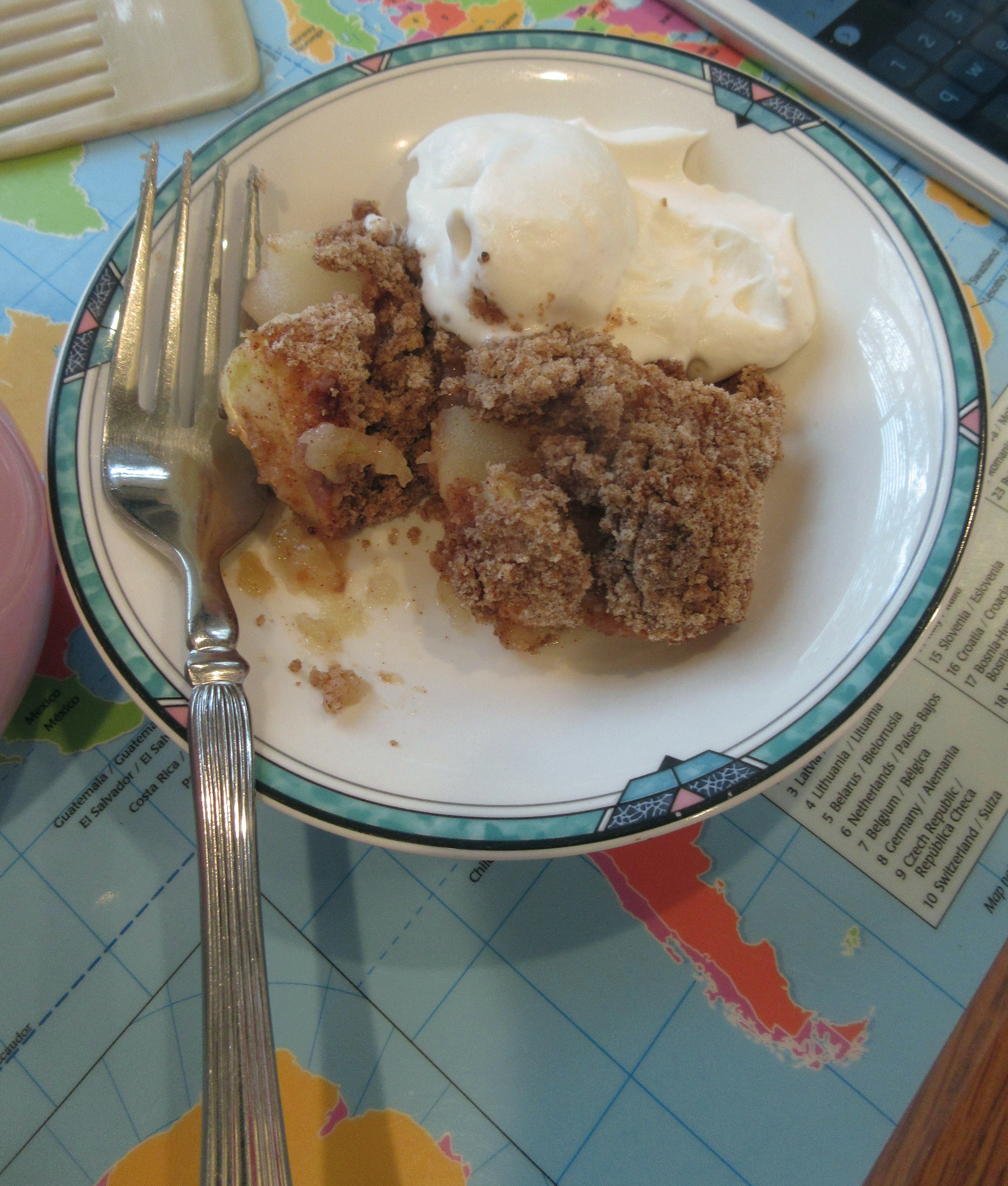
- Apple crisp with a scoop of vanilla ice cream
- Alternative names: Apple crumble
- Region or state: Everybody's Cookbook: United States
- Main ingredients: Apples; butter; sugar; flour; cinnamon; oats; brown sugar; ginger; nutmeg

Apple crisp (US, or apple crumble in the UK and Canada) is a baked fruit dessert made with a streusel topping. Ingredients usually include cooked apples, butter, sugar, flour, and cinnamon. An early reference to apple crisp appears in print in 1915.

== Recipe ==
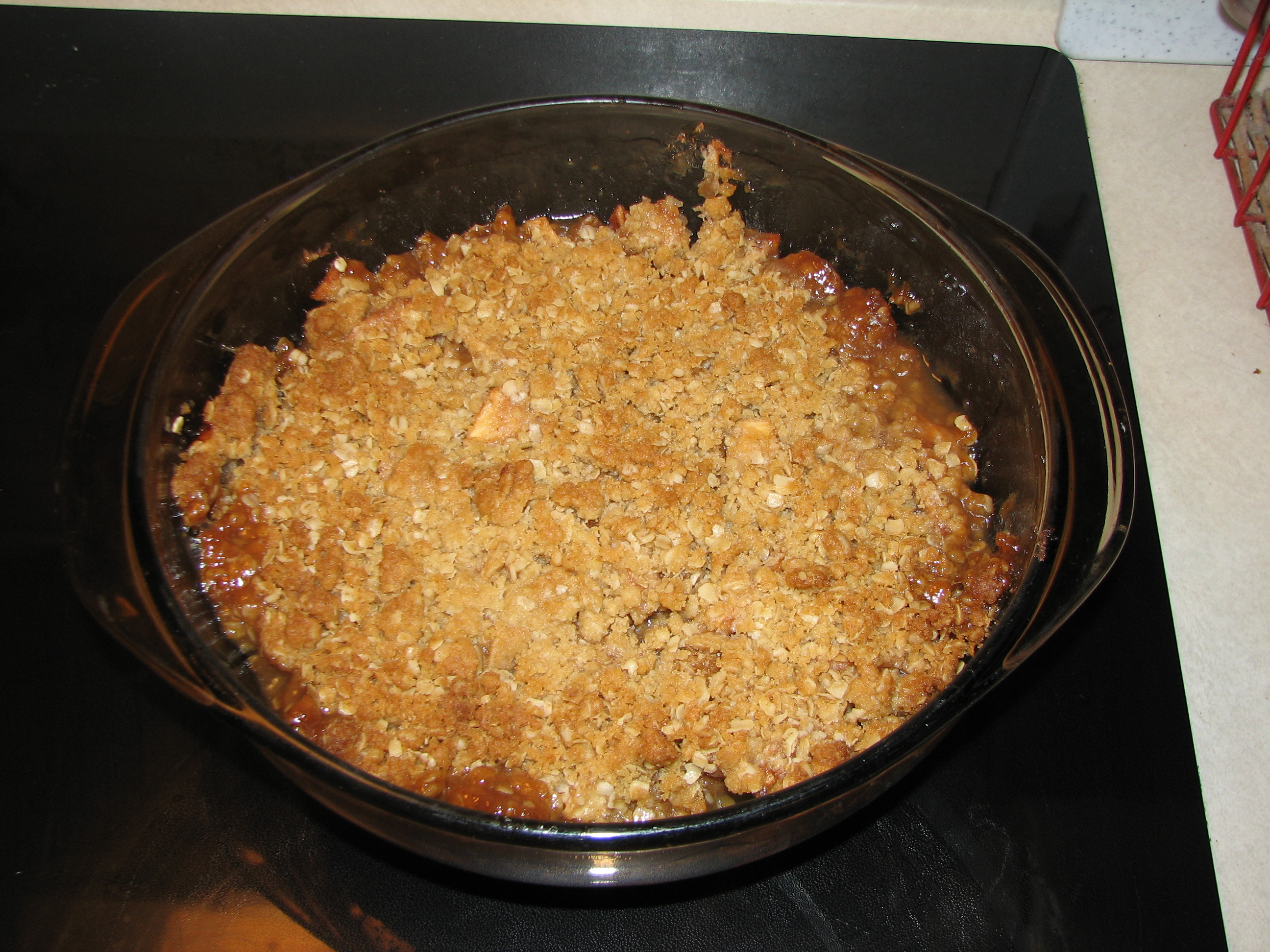
An apple crisp dessert

An apple crisp dessert is made with a streusel topping and apple filling. In the US, it is also called apple crumble, a word which refers to a different dessert in the UK, Canada, Australia, and New Zealand.

Ingredients usually include cooked apples, butter, sugar, flour, cinnamon, and often oats and brown sugar, ginger or nutmeg. One of the most common variants is apple rhubarb crisp, in which the rhubarb provides a tart contrast to the apples.

== History ==
Apple crisp is a relatively modern dish. It is notably absent from the first edition of the Fannie Farmer Cookbook (1896), which is a comprehensive collection of American recipes. Similar dishes for example, a recipe for apple pandowdy, a type of Cobbler is in Miss Corson's Practical American Cookery, 1886.

An early reference to a crumble-style topping was a recipe for apple crumble in the Canadian Farmer's Magazine in February 1917. However, the earliest reference to apple crisp specifically in print occurs in September 1915 edition of Good Housekeeping. Apple crisp also made an appearance in a newspaper article in the Appleton Post Crescent on December 9, 1924.

The related British dish, apple crumble, developed separately. British chef and food writer Hugh Fearnley-Whittingstall describes crumbles as a "national institution" that became popular in the United Kingdom after World War II, the crumble topping a simpler practical alternative to the pastry required for apple pie.

Despite their relatively recent invention, apple crisp and apple crumble have each become culinary traditions in their respective countries, particularly during autumn when apples are plentiful. Both dishes are also popular in Canada, especially in areas where berries and fruit are readily available. While apple is the most common filling, the format lends itself to a wide variety of fruits depending on the season, including rhubarb in spring, soft fruits such as gooseberries, raspberries and blackberries in summer, and plums and pears in autumn.

== Similar dishes ==
Many other kinds of fruit crisps are also made, these may substitute other fruits, such as peaches, berries, or pears, for the apples. There are a number of desserts that employ apples with sweet toppings, but none of them are the same as apple crisp, making them not so much variants, but instead other related apple desserts.

- Apple Brown Betty (or apple pudding) consists of alternating layers of apples and sweetened buttered bread crumbs or crackers, often with a sauce.
- Apple cobbler (also known as apple slump, apple grunt, and apple pandowdy) is an old recipe in which the baked apples are topped with a cobbler crust formed of batter, pie crust or baking powder biscuit dough. The topping may be dropped onto the top of the apples in clumps, which have a 'cobbled' appearance, thus the name. A 'grunt' is a cobbler cooked on top of the stove and a 'slump' is fruit and biscuit dumplings which is turned upside down after being baked so that the fruit is slumped into the fruit with a fork.
- Apple crumble is a British pudding similar to the apple crisp. The crumble topping is made of butter, flour, and brown sugar rolled together so that it resembles breadcrumbs. Care must be taken to balance the correct amount of crumble with the fruit, or else the filling may seep through and spoil this crust. Crumble is traditionally served with custard, but today it is sometimes served with cream or ice cream. Crumbles made from apples, and sometimes other fruits, are also common in Australia, New Zealand and Ireland.
- Apple pan dowdy most commonly features a pie crust, which is broken ("dowdied") before serving: it is a pie, not a cobbler.
- Apple pie is a pie in which the principal filling is apples. It is generally double-crusted, with pastry both above and below the filling, though may have a crumble or streusel topping.
- Eve's pudding is a British dessert that is essentially a sponge cake atop the apples. The name may originate from the biblical reference to Eve and the apple in the Garden of Eden.

== See also ==
- Crumble
- Crisp (dessert)
- List of apple dishes
- List of desserts
