= Streusel =

Central European baked food topping

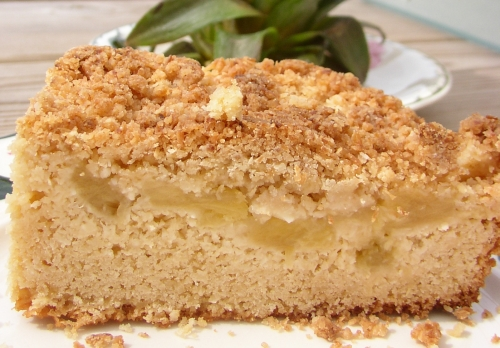
- A pineapple-coconut cake topped with streusel
- Region or state: Central Europe
- Main ingredients: Butter, flour, sugar

In baking and pastry making, streusel (/ˈstruːzəl, ˈstrɔɪzəl/ STROO-zəl, STROY-zəl, German: [ˈʃtʁɔʏzl̩]) is a crumbly topping of flour, butter, and sugar that is baked on top of muffins, breads, pies, and cakes. Some modern recipes add spices and chopped nuts. The mixture can also be layered or ribboned in the middle of a cake.

Some baked dishes which have a streusel topping are streuselkuchen, chałka, coffee cake, babka, and apple crisp.

The term is also sometimes used for rich pastries topped with, or mixed with, streusel.

== Etymology ==
From German Streusel ('something scattered or sprinkled'), from the verb streuen (cognate with the English verb strew).

In Polish, streusel is called kruszonka (pronounced [kruˈʂɔnka]), which comes from the word kruszyć ('to crumble').

== See also ==
- Soboro-ppang
- Crumble
