= Smulpaj =

Swedish crumble dessert

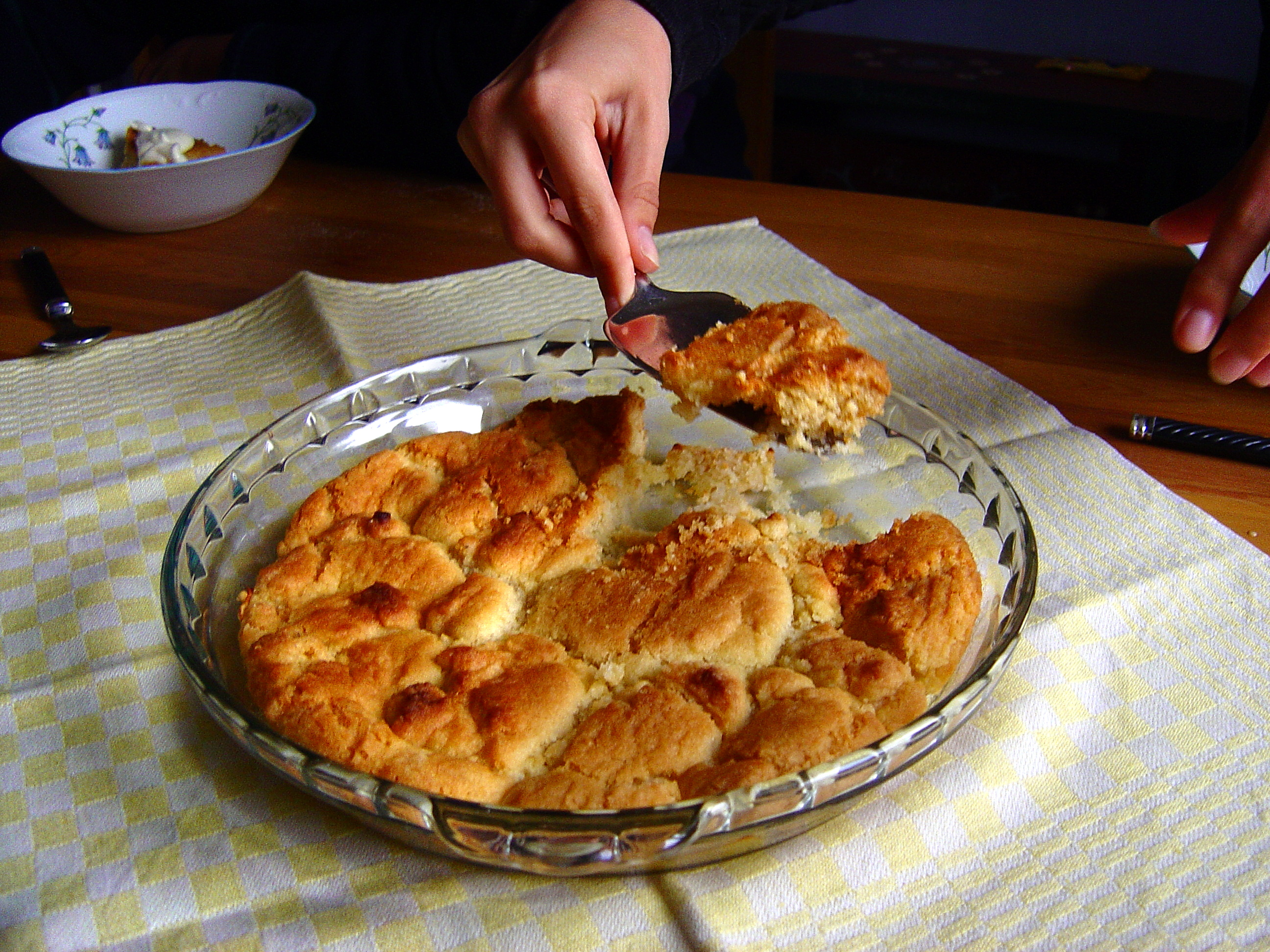
- Smulpaj made with apples
- Type: Crumble
- Course: Dessert
- Place of origin: Sweden
- Main ingredients: Butter, sugar, wheat flour, oatmeal; apples, rhubarb, or bilberries

Smulpaj (en. crumb pie) is a Swedish dessert. It is the Swedish version of a Crumble or crisp. The topping is made with Butter, which is mixed with sugar, wheat flour and oatmeal, which is then laid over fruit and then baked.

Smulpaj is commonly made with apples, rhubarb, or bilberries, and served with whipped cream, vanilla custard, or ice cream.
