= Crumble =

Baked fruit dessert

Crumble (or Crisp)
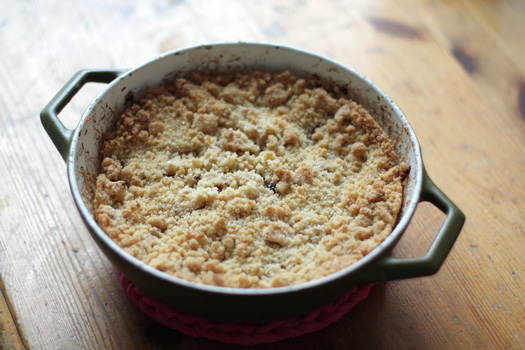
- Apple crumble
- Course: Dessert, Main
- Place of origin: North America
- Main ingredients: Stewed fruit, butter, flour, sugar Savoury: meat, vegetables, cheese
- Variations: Nuts, oats, coconut

A crumble (British English) or crisp (American English) is a baked fruit dessert with a streusel like topping, made with flour, sugar and fat (normally butter). They were simple dishes until after World War II, when they started to appear with recipes containing the addition of oats, nuts or coconut. With the popular fillings of apple and rhubarb for sweet dessert varieties, there are savoury fillings which contain meat, cheese or vegetables. As a dessert, crumbles and crisps are traditionally served with custard, cream, or ice cream.

Crumbles in varying forms are common in Britain, Ireland, and across the Commonwealth of Nations, with le crumble making its way into French cuisine. While crumbles are found in the US, the more common "apple crisp" is prevalent. The comparison between crisps and crumbles has sparked debate.

== History ==
Crumble and Crisp are a relatively modern dish. It is notably absent from the first edition of the Fannie Farmer Cookbook (1896), which is a comprehensive collection of American recipes, while Alan Davidson in his book The Oxford Companion to Food said there were no recipes that he could find in early cook books, so thought it was a WWII food recipe, much like Cobbler history in the UK.

The earliest reference for apple crisp may be in the September 1915 edition of Good Housekeeping magazine, while the first apple crumble recipe may be in the Canadian Farmer's Magazine in February 1917, both featuring a simple streusel like topping of flour, sugar and butter. Crisp and Crumble recipes were interchangeable, as early recipes did not include any additional ingredients, with Union Pacific Coal Company's 1934 employer magazine recipe for Apple Crumble being exactly the same as the 1915 Crisp recipe from Good Housekeeping. In the late 1930s, recipes started to appear in the US that included peanuts, peanut butter and cereal flakes in crumbles and crisps. However, major publications such as The United States Regional Cook Book,, America Cooks. Favourite Recipes from 48 states and The New American Cook Book had recipes for Crisp that were still free of any additional ingredients, as was home economist text books of the time.

During World War II, when rationing to households made it hard to make pastry for pie, the Ministry of Food in the UK employed home economists and chefs to come up with alternative recipes. Marguerite Patten was one of these home economists, and she provided several recipes for crumble that used margarine, instead of butter which was rationed. Food writer Philip Harben in his Cookery Encyclopedia called it an unusual dish, however, the dessert has since become a "national institution" as described by British chef and food writer Hugh Fearnley-Whittingstall.

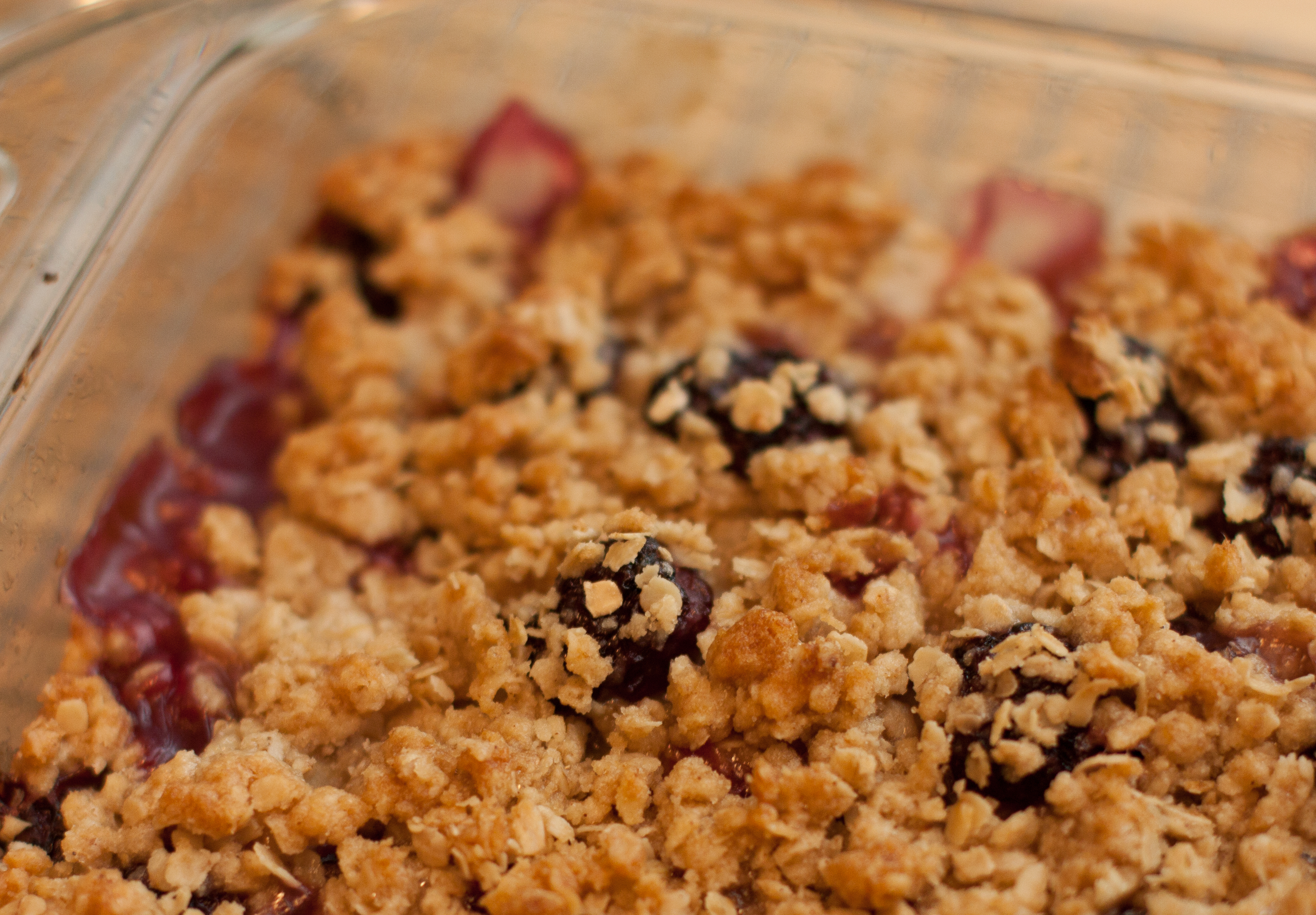
Detail of a blackberry pear crumble

The earliest recipe book to contain oats in a Crisp was probably in the 1943 The Questors Cook Book, however the US Navy were using the plain flour, sugar and butter mix in 1944, while The Lily Wallace New American Cookbook of 1945 had no mention of any additional ingredients. (Note: Lily Wallace was a well known cookbook writer and editor of Woman’s World magazine) A later mention of adding oats was in Adelle Davis' Lets Cook it Right, where Apple Crisp comes under a variation of an Apple Betty, and says you can use whole wheat flour, wheat germ or quick-cooking rolled oats. However, in 500 Recipes By Request. From Mother Anderson's Famous Dutch Kitchens from a year later, no flour or oats are used. Instead crushed up Graham Cracker were used. However major cookbooks like Ann Pillsbury's and Betty Crocker's 1950 recipe contained no oats. (Note: Ann Pillsbury was the publicity name of Ruth Andre Krause, the director of home economics at Pillsbury) This was still the same by the end of the decade, in both Fannie Farmer Cookbook of 1959, and the Ford Treasury of Favorite Recipes from Famous Eating Places, but oats had made their first appearance in Betty Crocker in 1956.

In the early 60s, the New York Times cookbook included chopped nuts in the topping recipe. Anne Seranne's The Complete Book of Desserts was still based upon the traditional streusel recipe. (Note: Anne Seranne was the pen name of Margaret Ruth Smith, a food writer who was the former food editor at Gourmet magazine and a food columnist at the New York Post) but further crisp recipes started to appear that contained oats, including in text books.

== Crisp or crumble ==
There is debate from a lack of consensus over the comparison and contrast between crisps and crumbles, their differences, and whether they are the same dessert.

On the one hand, culinary media such as Taste of Home wrote: "Crumbles have a streusel topping. Crisps tend to use oats and nuts, which gives the finished dessert a crunchier texture." The Kitchn claims the difference is in whether there are nuts, and that in a crisp, "The oats in the topping crisp up as it bakes, hence the name. As time has gone by, though, the lines have blurred and the names crumble and crisp are now used interchangeably."

On the other hand, newspapers such as The Washington Post said "There’s very little daylight between crisps and crumbles, but for those who have tried to draw the line, the inclusion of oats and/or nuts in the topping may be what sets the former apart, though that’s not always the case." Marian Burros similarly wrote for The New York Times that "Crisps and crumbles are either equally confusing or exactly the same. If there is a difference, the distinction is lost on me."

== See also ==
- Brown Betty
- Cobbler (food)
- Crisp
- Smulpaj, a similar Swedish dessert
- Streusel
