= Brown Betty (dessert) =

American dessert

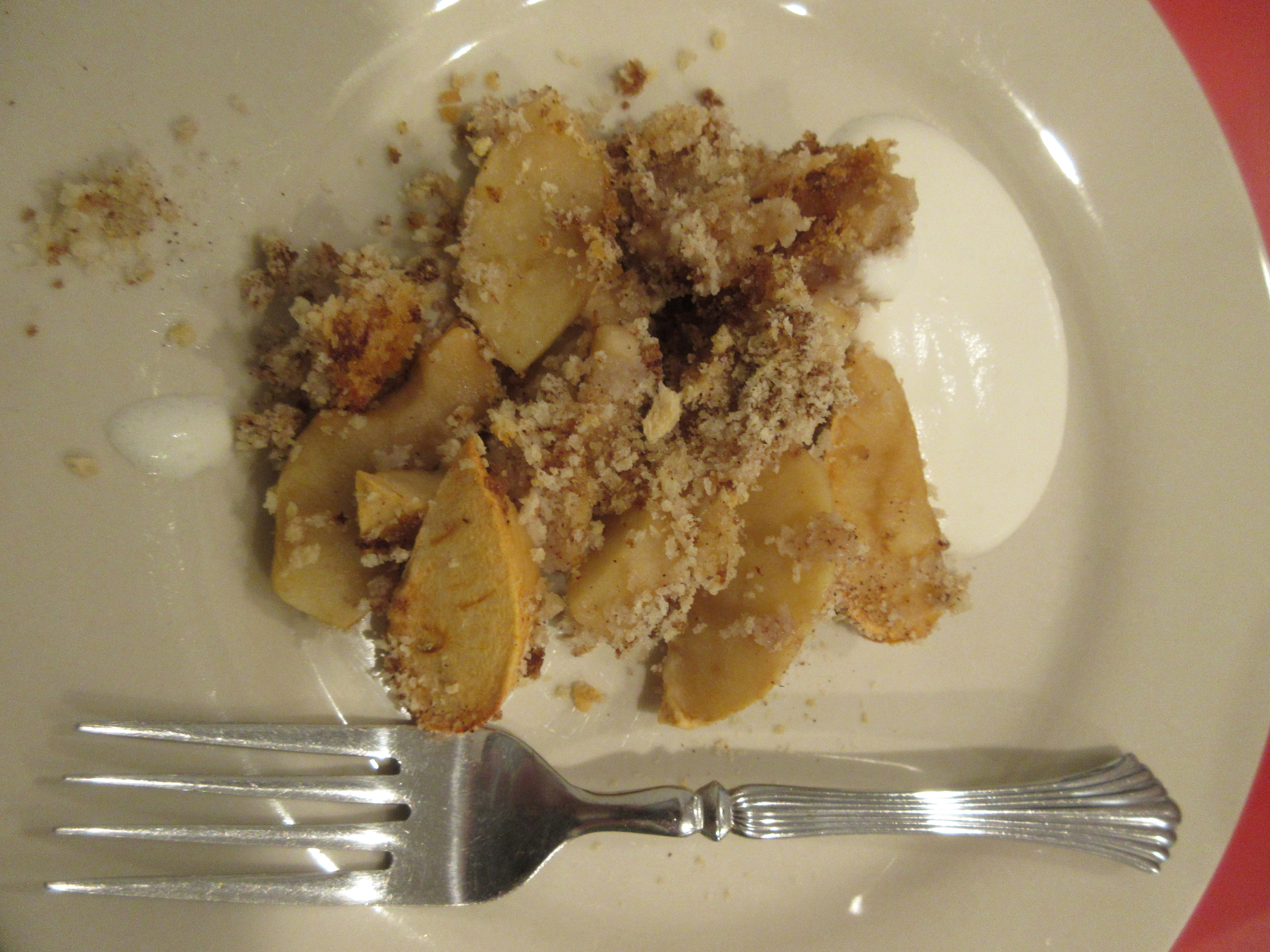
- A serving of Brown Betty, made with apples
- Type: Pudding
- Course: Dessert
- Place of origin: United States
- Main ingredients: Bread crumbs, butter, fruit (usually apple, but also berries or pears)

A Brown Betty is a traditional American dessert made from fruit, usually apple (this variant is known as Apple Betty), but also berries or pears and sweetened crumbs. Similar to a cobbler or apple crisp, the fruit is baked, and, in this case, the sweetened crumbs are placed in layers between the fruit. It is sometimes served with lemon sauce or whipped cream.

The dish was first mentioned in print in 1864, although a dish called rich baked apple pudding with a similar recipe was recorded in Mrs. Beeton's Book of Household Management of 1861. A recipe from 1877 uses apple sauce and cracker crumbs.

Apple Brown Betty was one of the favorite desserts of Ronald and Nancy Reagan in the White House.

Brown Betty was also depicted as a favorite recipe that King of the Hill character Peggy Hill would make across a number of episodes.

== See also ==
- Apple crisp – Apple-based snack, with streusel topping
- Cobbler – Baked dish resembling a pie
- Crumble – Baked fruit dessert
- List of apple dishes
