= Raspberry juice =

Juice made from raspberries

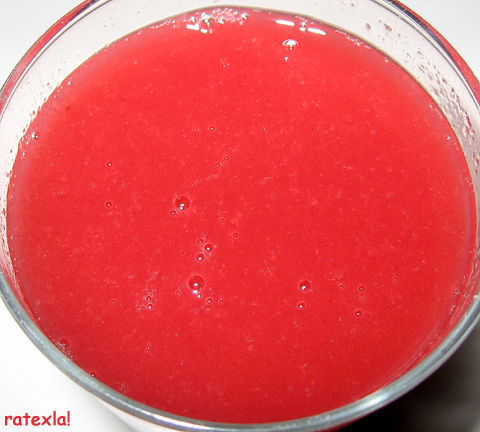
Raspberry juice

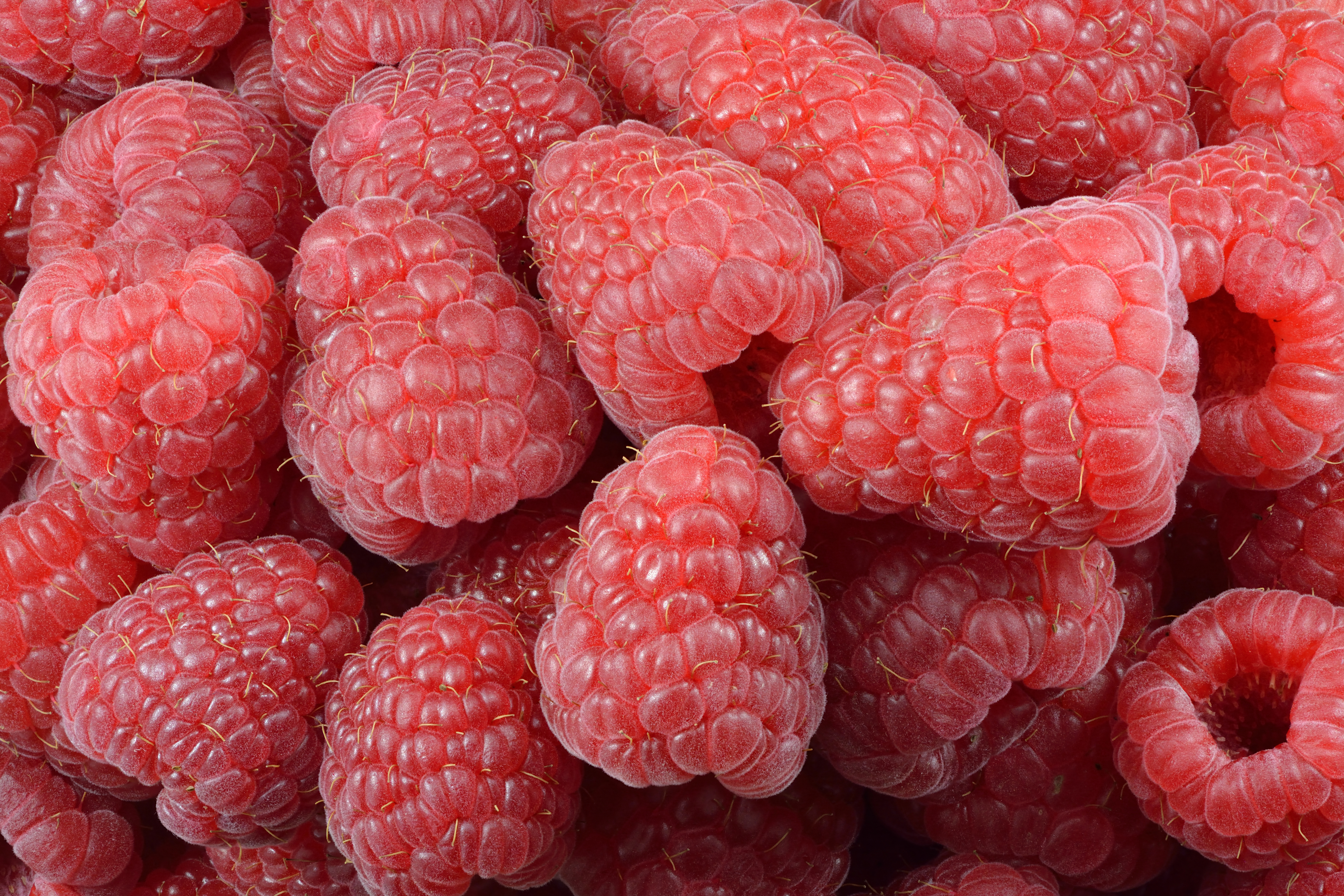
Fresh raw raspberries.

Raspberry juice is a liquid created from raspberries that is often either used as a part of a mixed drink, added in with other liquids such as orange juice, or consumed by itself. Soft drinks that incorporate raspberry juice notably include Bouvrage (discontinued), a product made from Scottish raspberries. Launched in 1998 at that year's Royal Highland Show, bouvrage included sparkling water and was intended to be somewhat sweet, but with a higher fruit content than similar products.

== Production ==
Production steps include:

- Reception - sorting and washing
- Crushing - gently squeezing the berries and breaking the skins to start to liberate the contents of the berries
- Pressing - the timing of pressing and how much pressure is applied affect the juice
- Clarifying - removal of suspended insoluble matter
- Pasteurization - treatment with mild heat to eliminate pathogens and extend shelf life
- Packaging - enclosing product for distribution

== Uses ==
Raspberry juice can also be used to make smoothies. Other berries, such as blueberries, are commonly added either in whole, crushed, or juiced form.

Other examples of its use include as a part of cocktails as part of mixed alcoholic drinks served in bars and restaurants, and as a key ingredient in making the raspberry jelly desserts.

== See also ==
- Juicing
- List of juices
