= Berry =

In the culinary sense, small edible fruit

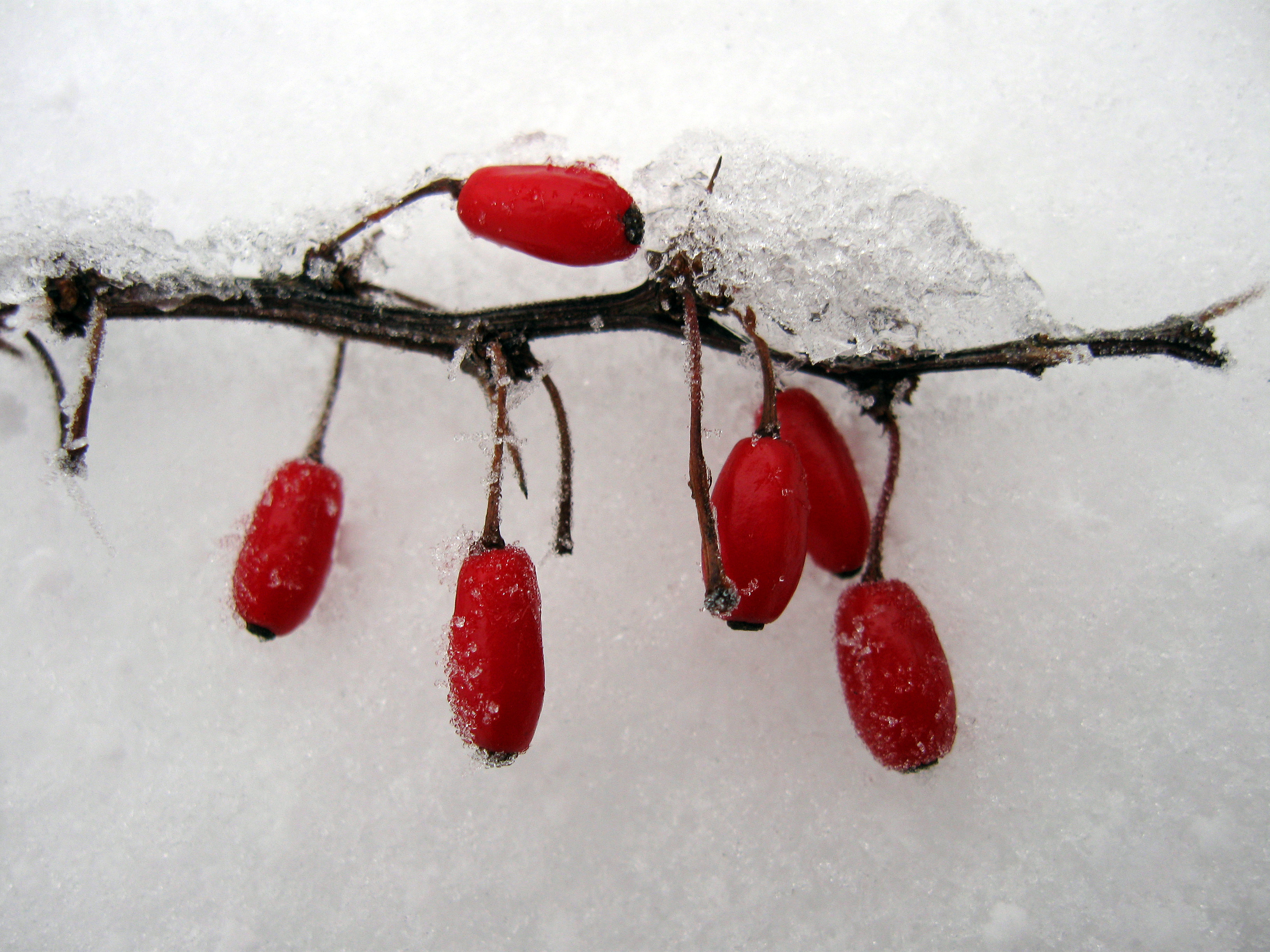
Japanese barberries

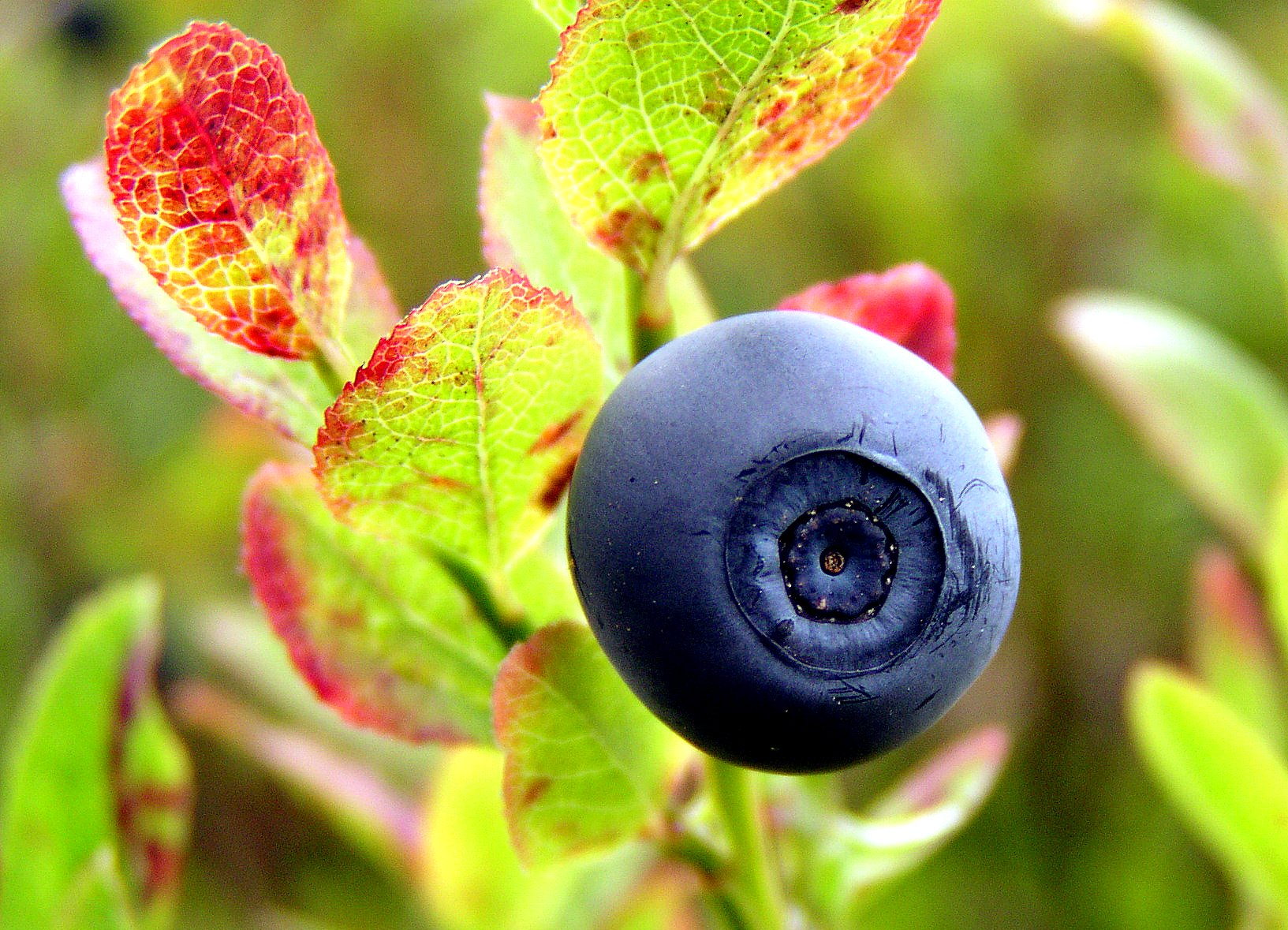
Bilberry

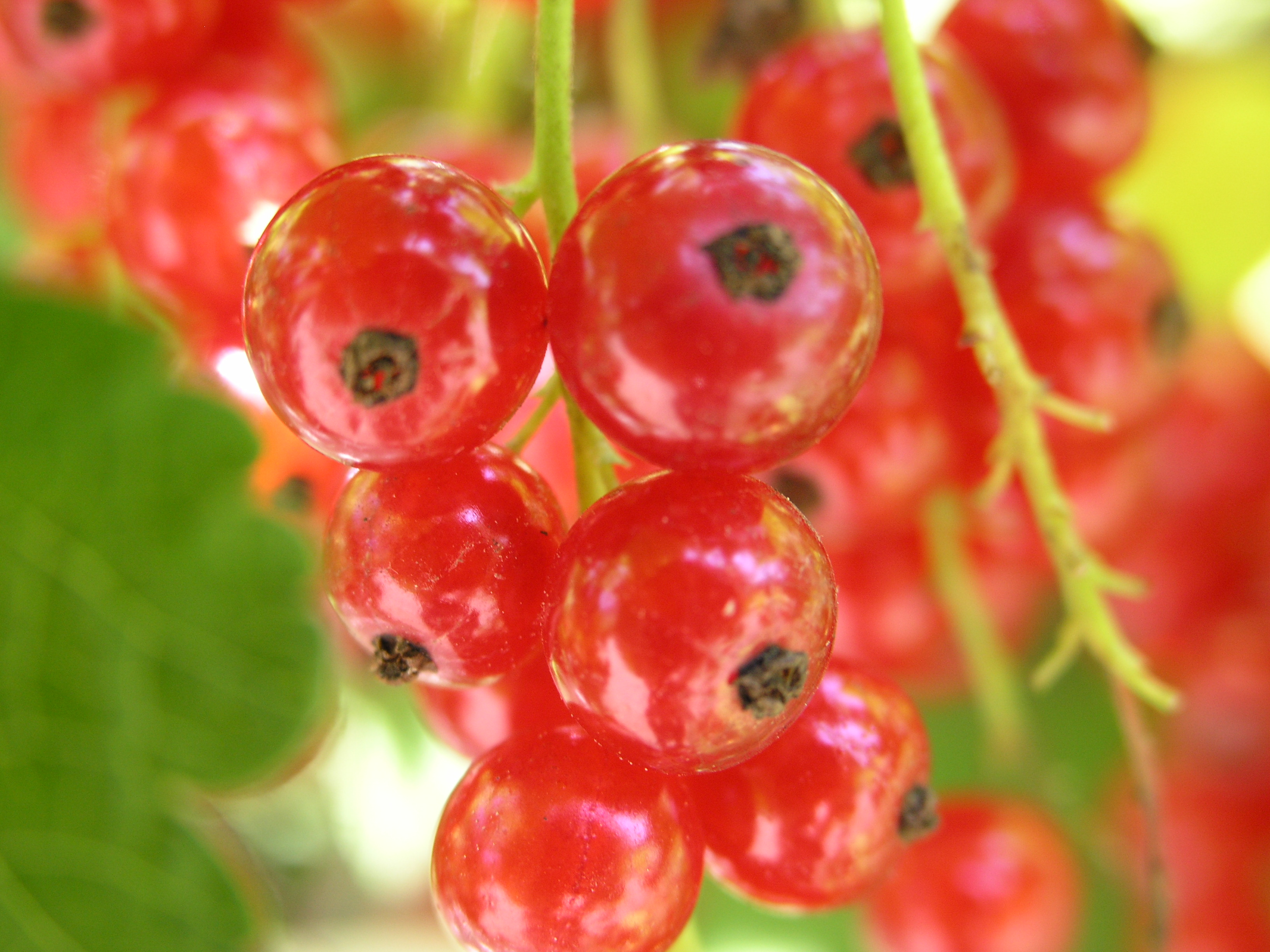
Redcurrants

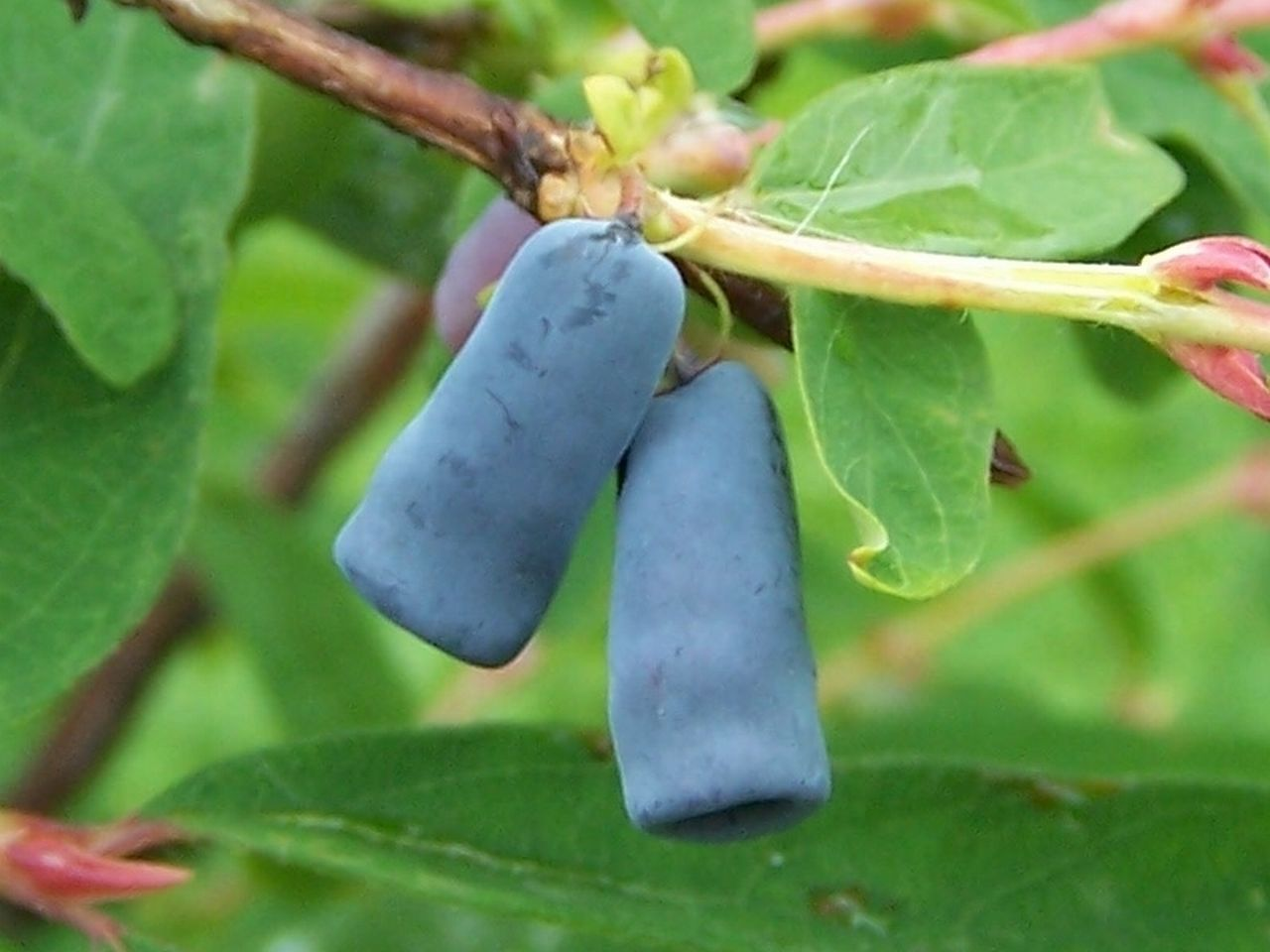
Honeysuckle

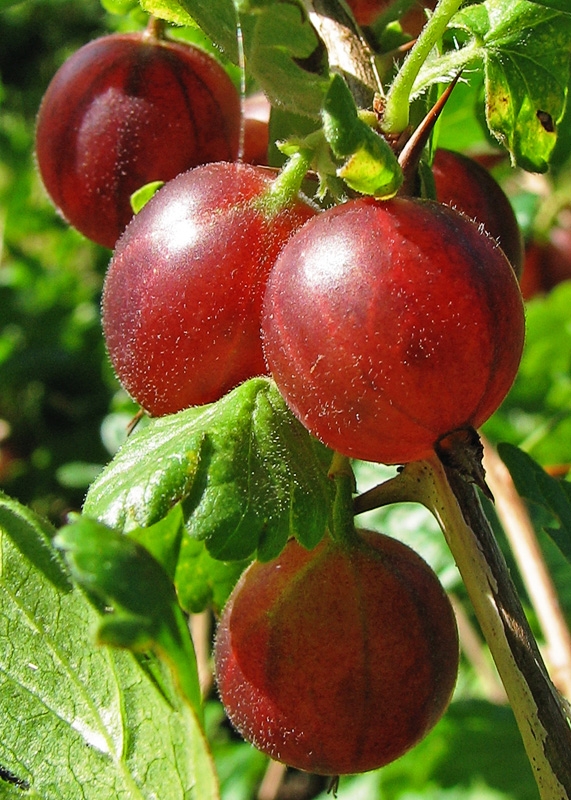
Gooseberries

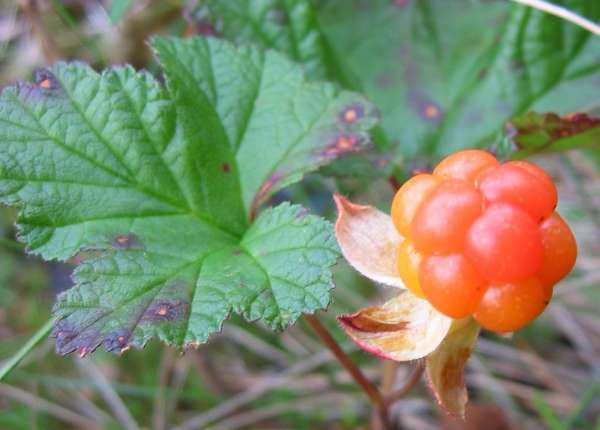
Cloudberry

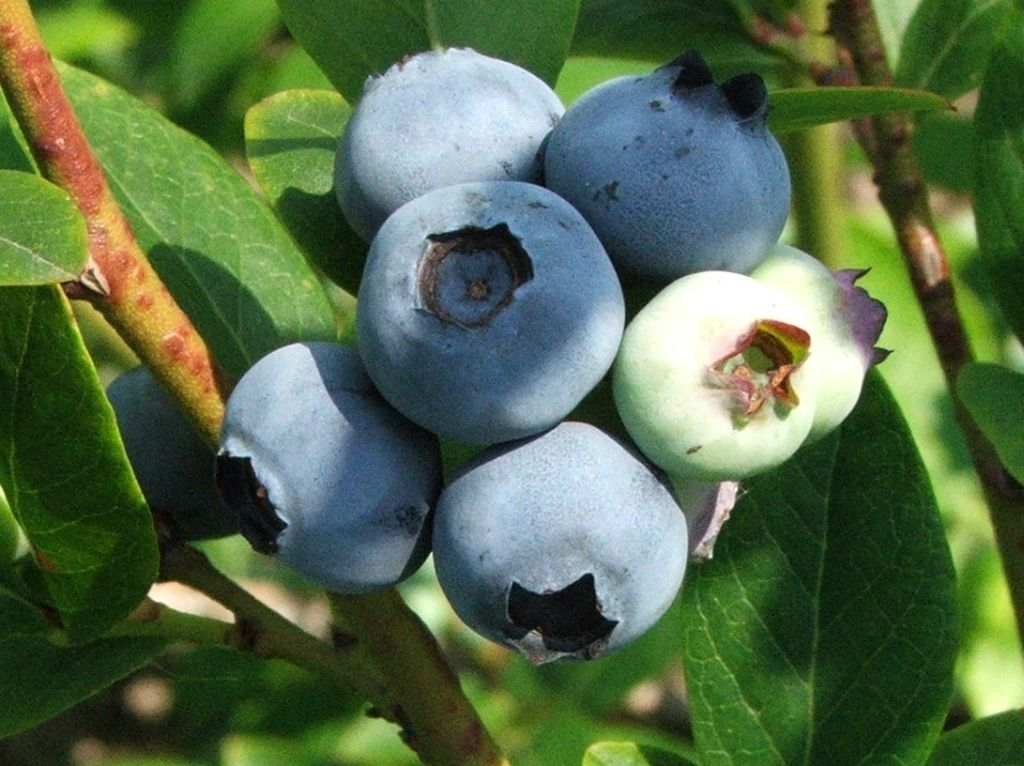
Highbush blueberries

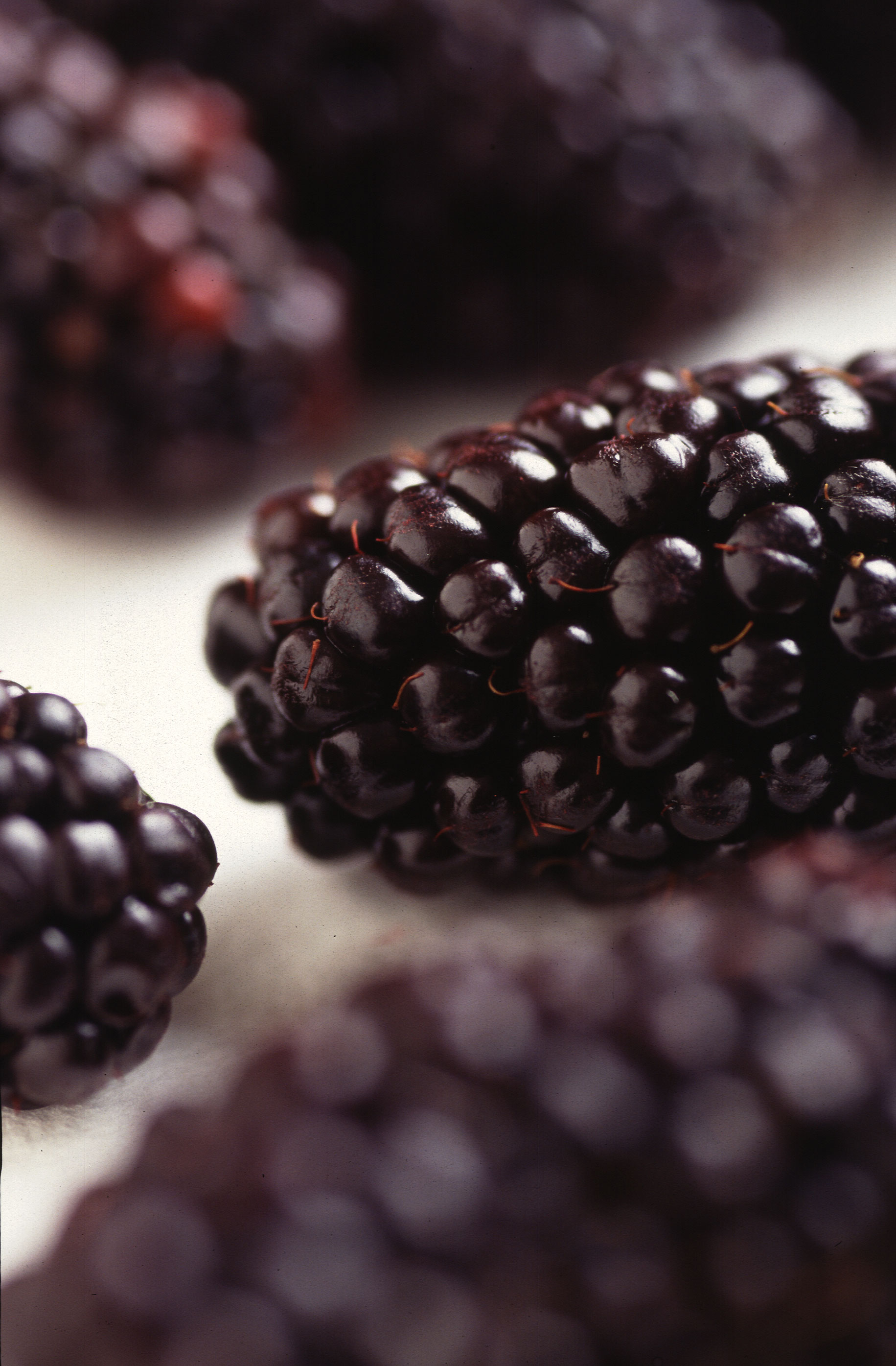
Blackberries

A berry is a small, pulpy, and often edible fruit. Typically, berries are juicy, rounded, brightly colored, sweet, sour or tart, and do not have a stone or pit although many pips or seeds may be present.‍ Common examples of berries in the culinary sense are strawberries, raspberries, blueberries, blackberries, white currants, blackcurrants, and redcurrants.‍ In Britain, soft fruit is a horticultural term for such fruits.‍

The common usage of the term "berry" is different from the scientific or botanical definition of a berry, which refers to a fleshy fruit produced from the ovary of a single flower where the outer layer of the ovary wall develops into an edible fleshy portion (pericarp). The botanical definition includes many fruits that are not commonly known or referred to as berries,‍ such as grapes, tomatoes, cucumbers, eggplants, bananas, and chili peppers. Fruits commonly considered berries but excluded by the botanical definition include strawberries, raspberries, and blackberries, which are aggregate fruits, and mulberries, which are multiple fruits. Watermelons and pumpkins are giant berries that fall into the category "pepos". A plant bearing berries is said to be bacciferous or baccate.

Berries are eaten worldwide and often used in jams, preserves, cakes, or pies. Some berries are commercially important. The berry industry varies from country to country as do types of berries cultivated or growing in the wild. Some berries such as raspberries and strawberries have been bred for hundreds of years and are distinct from their wild counterparts, while other berries, such as lingonberries and cloudberries, grow almost exclusively in the wild.

While many berries are edible, some are poisonous to humans, such as those of deadly nightshade and pokeweed. Others, such as the white mulberry, red mulberry,‍ and elderberry,‍ are poisonous when unripe, but edible when ripe.

== History ==
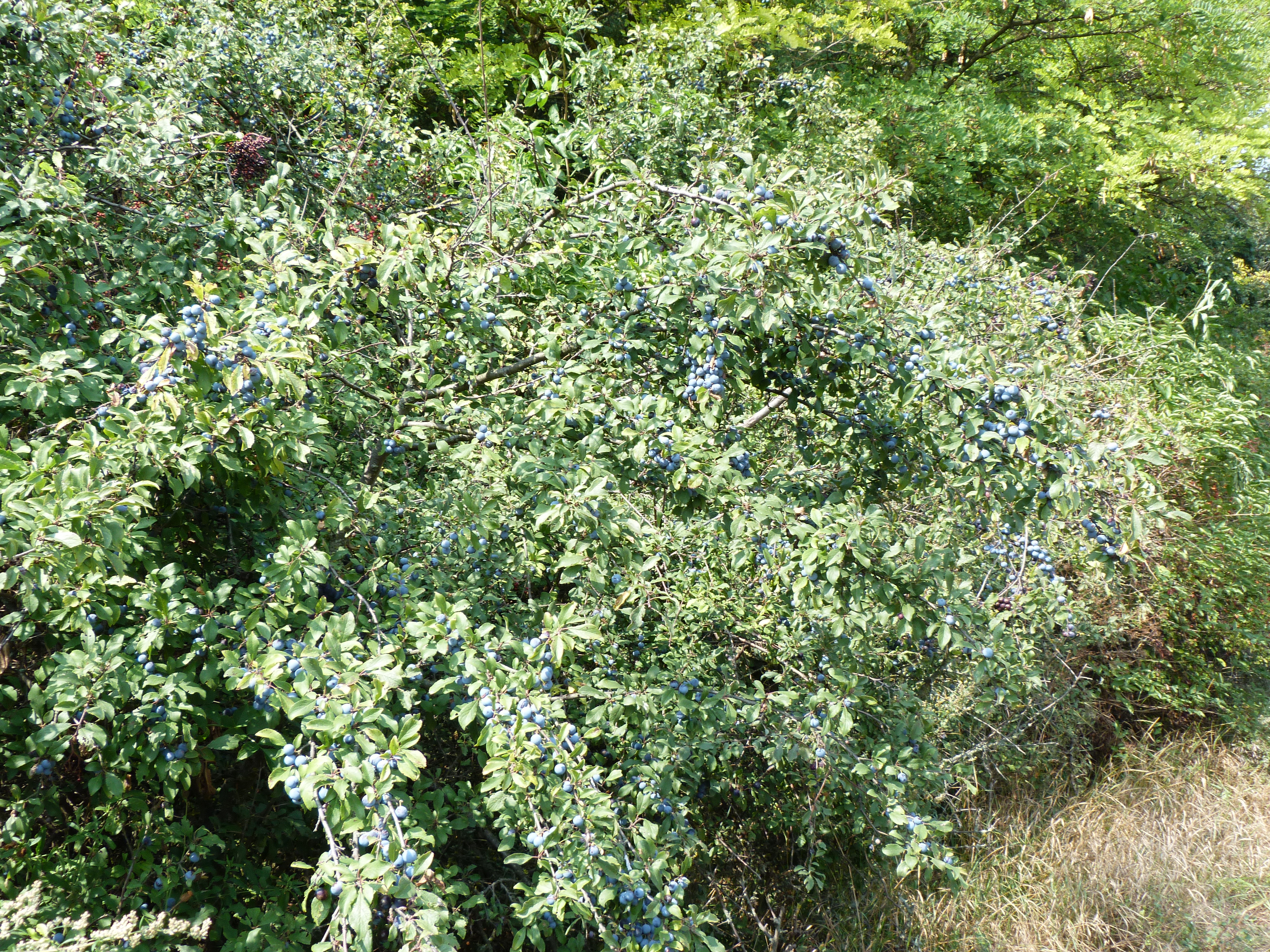
Blackthorn, Prunus spinosa

Berries have been valuable as a food source for humans since before the start of agriculture, and remain a food source for other primates. They were a seasonal staple for early hunter-gatherers for thousands of years, and wild berry gathering remains a popular activity in Europe and North America today. In time, humans learned to store berries so that they could be used in the winter. They may be made into fruit preserves, and among Native Americans, mixed with meat and fats as pemmican.‍

Berries also began to be cultivated in Europe and other countries. Some species of blackberries and raspberries of the genus Rubus have been cultivated since the 17th century, while smooth-skinned blueberries and cranberries of the genus Vaccinium have been cultivated in the United States for over a century.‍ In Japan, between the 10th and 18th centuries, the terms ichibigo and ichigo (kanji: 苺; katakana: イチゴ) referred to many berry crops. The most widely cultivated berry of modern times is the strawberry, which is produced globally at twice the amount of all other berry crops combined.‍

The strawberry was mentioned by ancient Romans, who thought it had medicinal properties,‍ but it was then not a staple of agriculture.‍ Woodland strawberries began to be grown in French gardens in the 14th century. The musk strawberry (F. moschata), also known as the hautbois strawberry, began to be grown in European gardens in the late 16th century. Later, the Virginia strawberry was grown in Europe and the United States.‍ The most commonly consumed strawberry, the garden strawberry (F. ananassa), is an accidental hybrid of the Virginia strawberry and a Chilean variety Fragaria chiloensis. It was first noted by a French gardener around the mid 18th century that, when F. moschata and F. virginiana were planted in between rows of F. chiloensis, the Chilean strawberry would bear abundant and unusually large fruits. Soon after, Antoine Nicolas Duchesne began to study the breeding of strawberries and made several discoveries crucial to the science of plant breeding, such as the sexual reproduction of strawberry.‍ Later, in the early 1800s, English breeders of strawberry made varieties of F. ananassa which were important in strawberry breeding in Europe,‍ and hundreds of cultivars have since been produced through the breeding of strawberries.‍

=== Etymology ===
The Old English word berie ('berry, grape') comes from Proto-Germanic, variously reconstructed as *basją, *bazją, *basjom (source also of Old Norse ber, Middle Dutch bere, German Beere, 'berry', Old Saxon winberi, Gothic weinabasi, 'grape'), which is of unknown origin. This and "apple" are the only fruit names in modern English which are descended from "native" Germanic words.‍

== Botanical definition ==
Culinary berries but not botanical berries

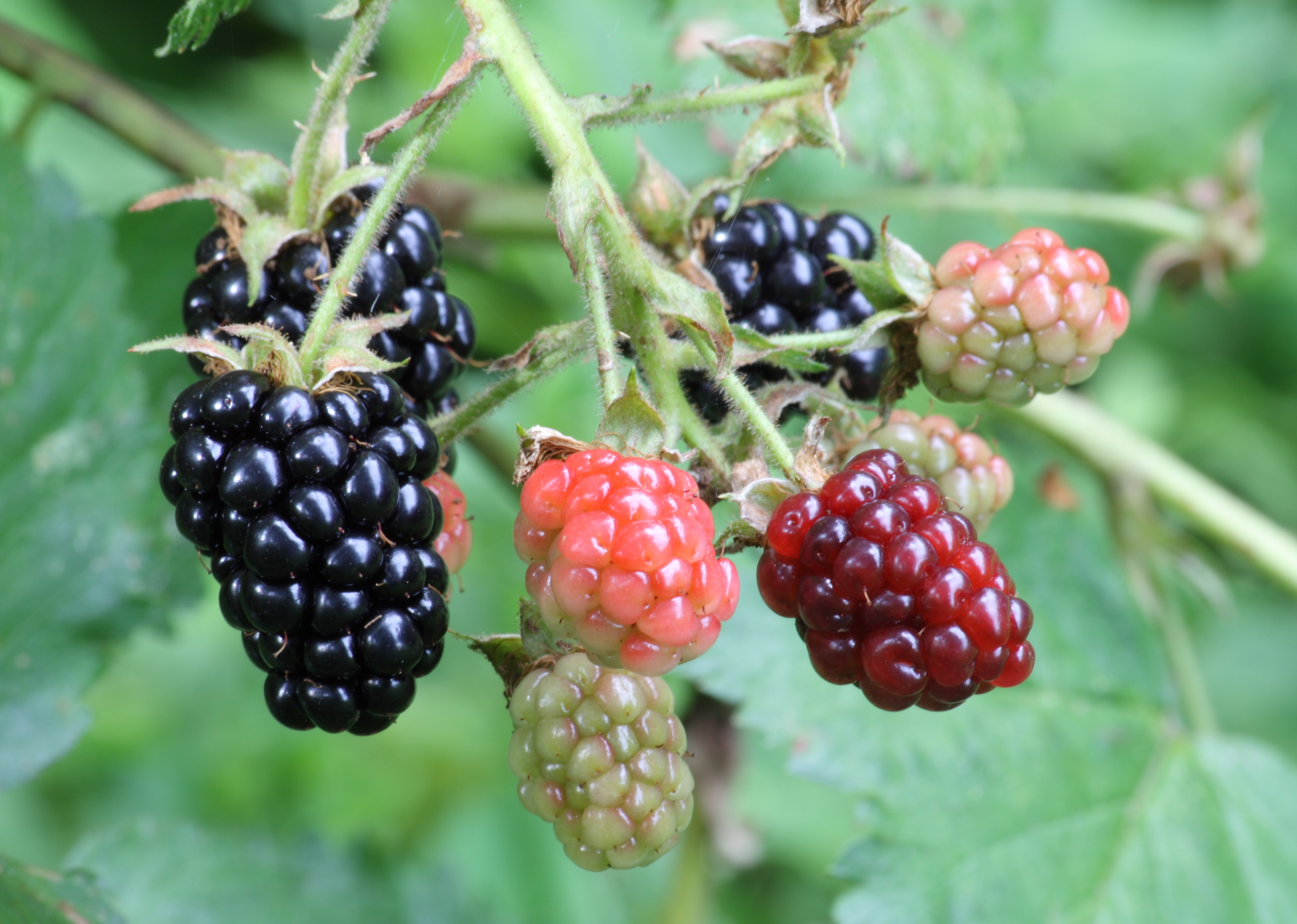
Blackberries – botanically: aggregate fruits

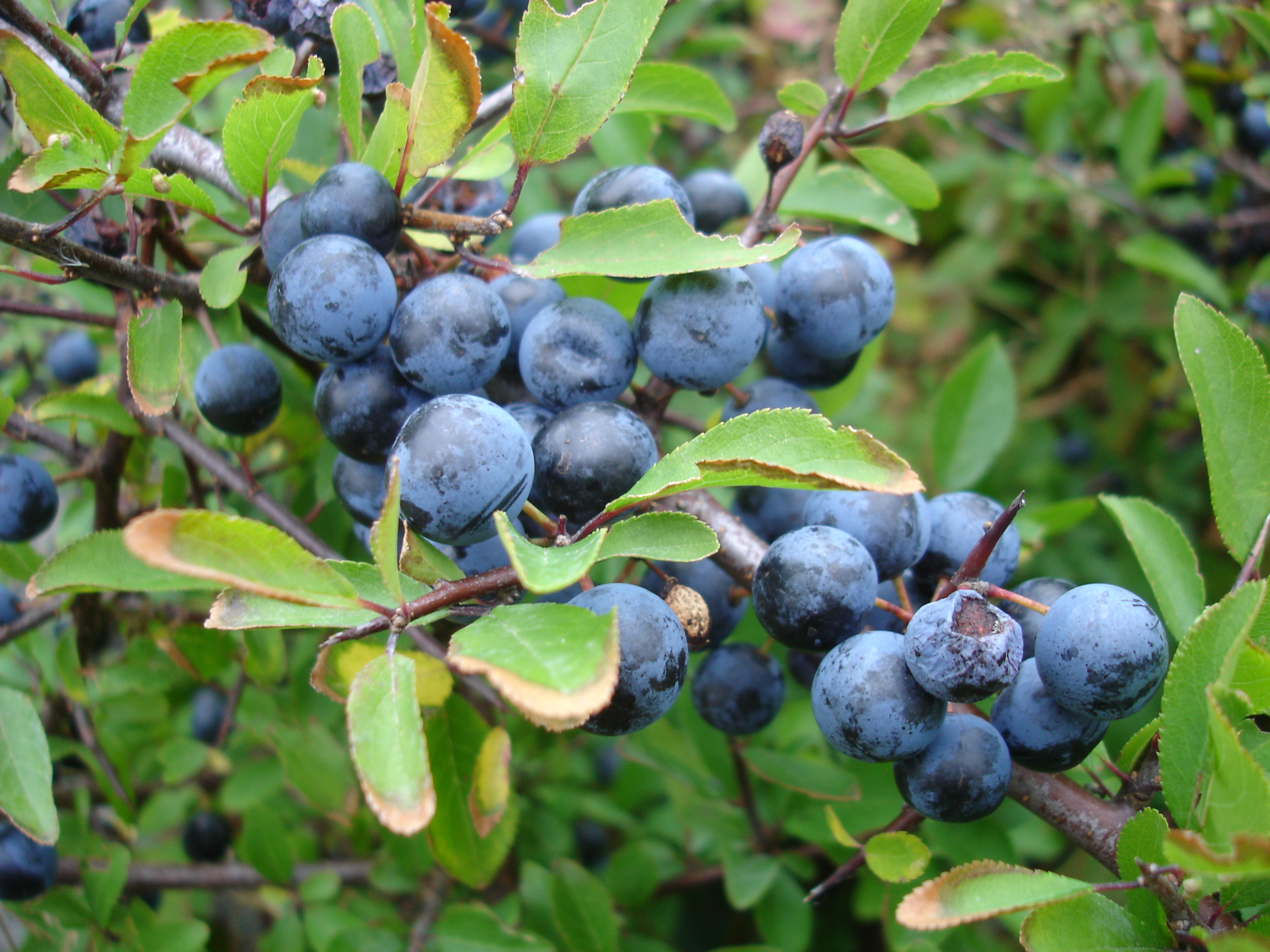
Sloe berries – botanically: stone fruits or drupes

Berries in the culinary and botanical sense

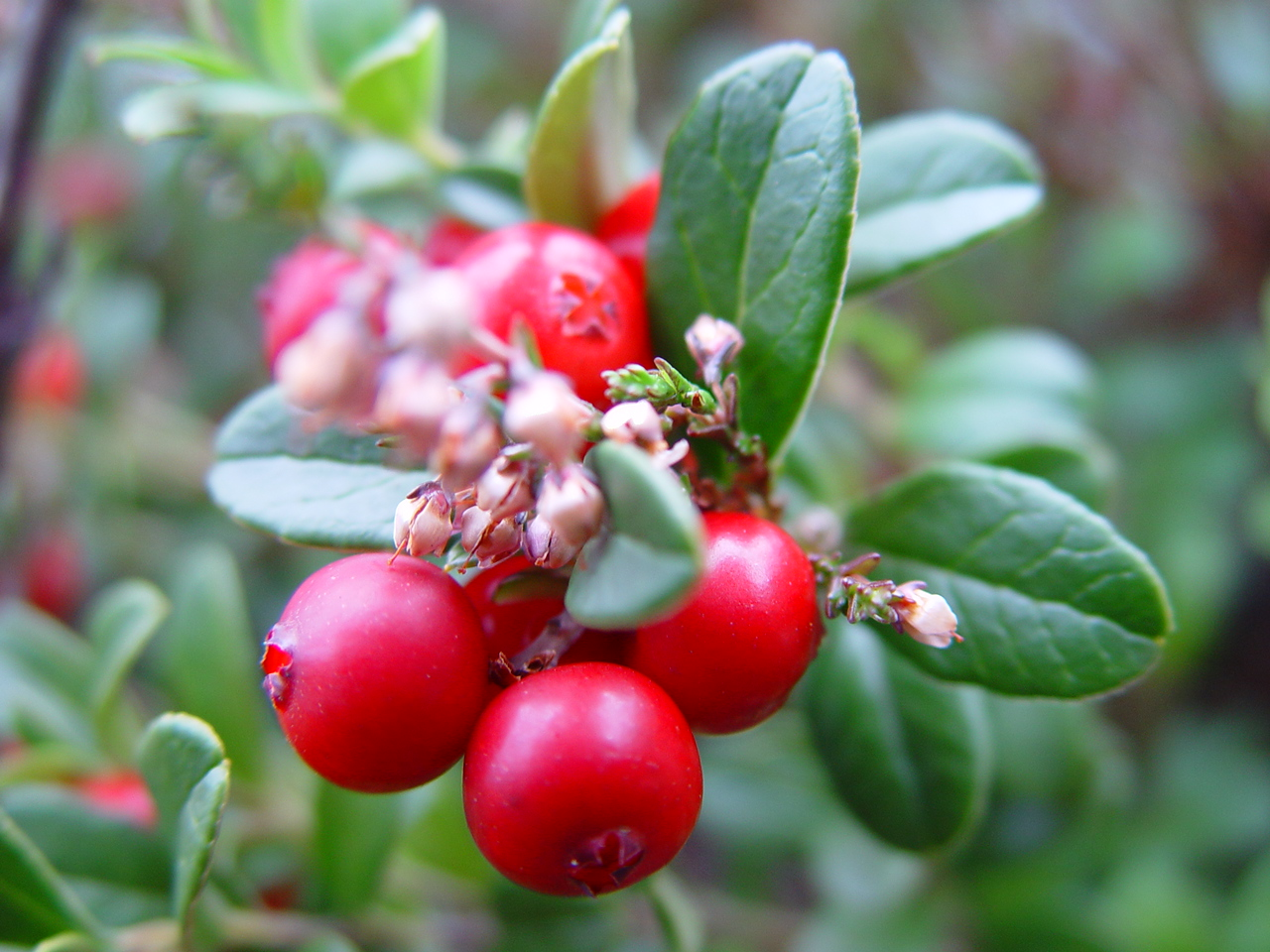
Lingonberries

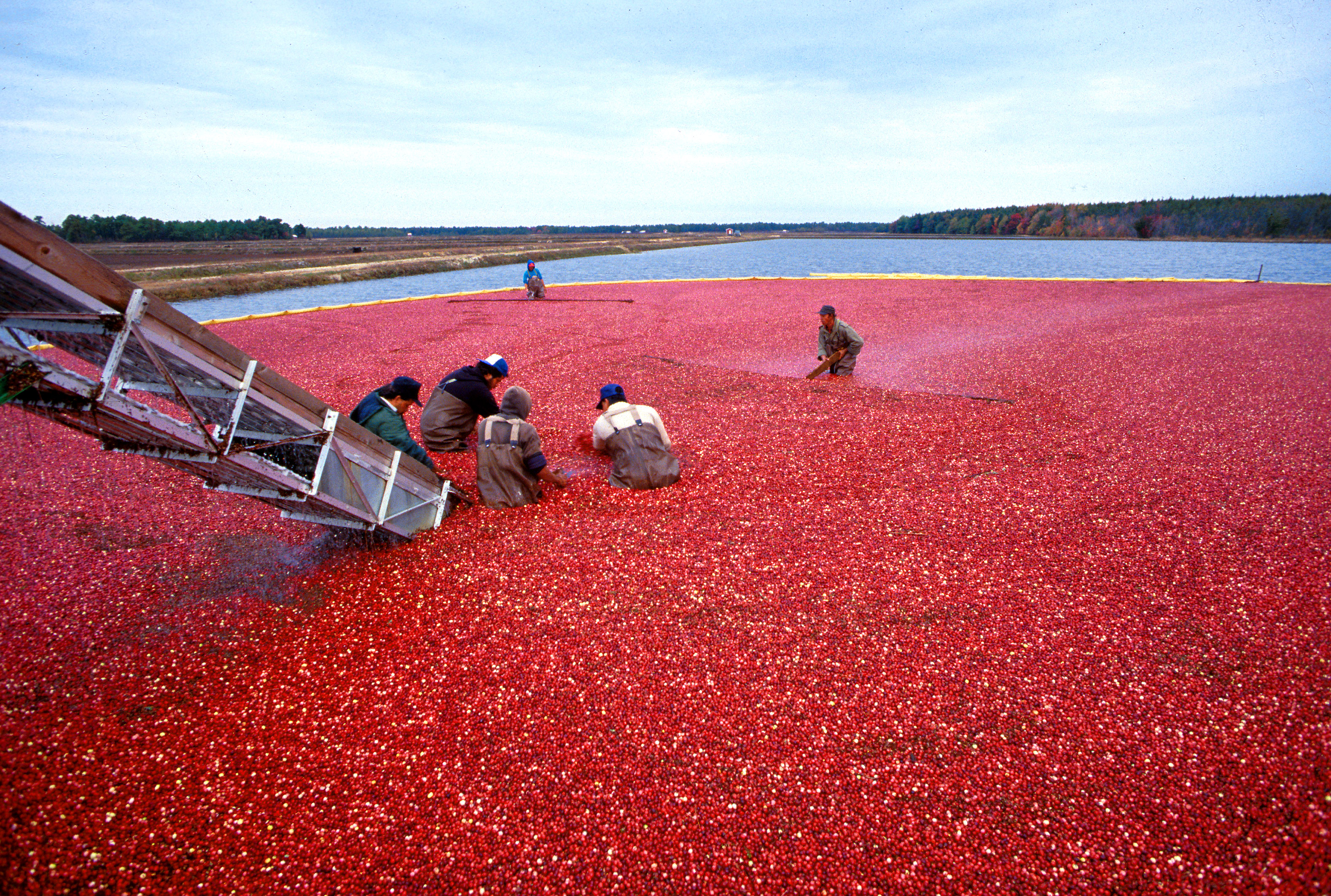
Cranberries

Botanical berries but not culinary berries

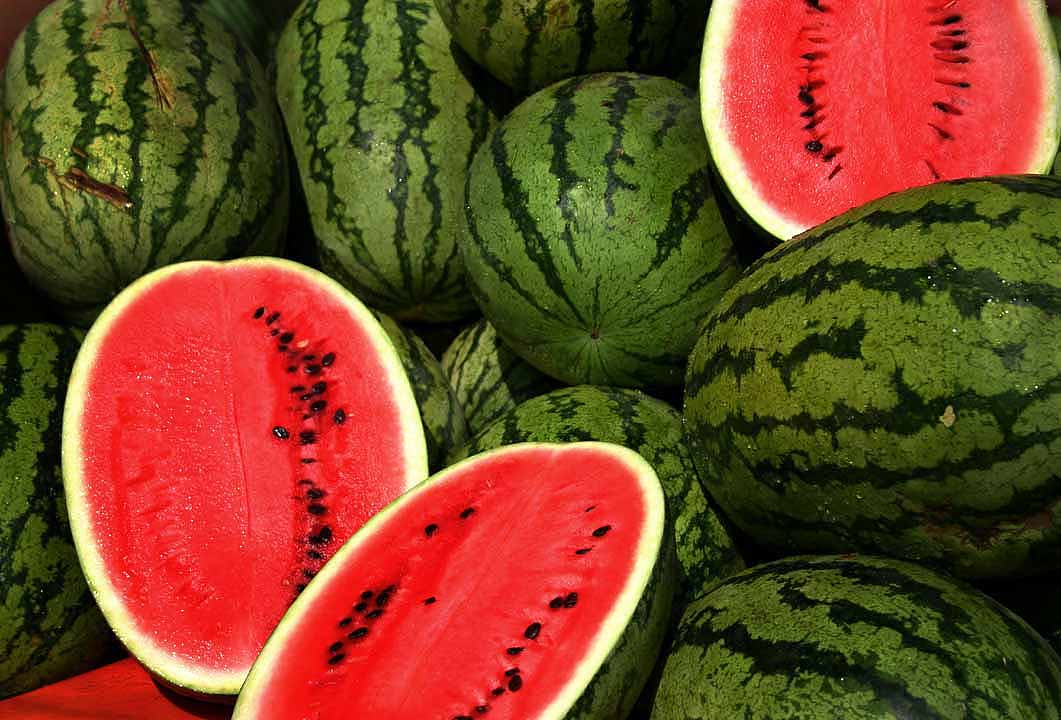
Watermelons

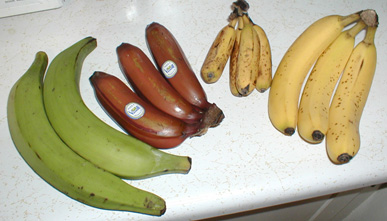
Bananas

In botanical terminology, a berry is a simple fruit with seeds and pulp produced from the ovary of a single flower. It is fleshy throughout, except for the seeds. It does not have a special "line of weakness" along which it splits to release the seeds when ripe (i.e. it is indehiscent).‍ A berry may develop from an ovary with one or more carpels (the female reproductive structures of a flower). The seeds are usually embedded in the fleshy interior of the ovary, but there are some non-fleshy examples such as peppers, with air rather than pulp around their seeds. The differences between the everyday and botanical uses of "berry" result in three categories: those fruits that are berries under both definitions; those fruits that are botanical berries but not commonly known as berries; and those parts of plants commonly known as berries that are not botanical berries, and may not even be fruits.

Berries under both definitions include blueberries, cranberries, lingonberries, and the fruits of many other members of the heather family, as well as gooseberries, goji berries, and elderberries. The fruits of some "currants" (Ribes species), such as blackcurrants, red currants and white currants, are botanical berries, and are treated as horticultural berries (or as soft fruit in the UK), even though their most commonly used names do not include the word "berry".

Botanical berries not commonly known as berries include bananas,‍ tomatoes,‍ grapes, eggplants (aubergines), persimmons, watermelons, and pumpkins.

There are several different kinds of fruits which are commonly called berries, but are not botanical berries. Blackberries, raspberries, and strawberries are kinds of aggregate fruit;‍ they contain seeds from different ovaries of a single flower. In aggregate fruits like blackberries, the individual "fruitlets" making up the fruit can be clearly seen. The fruits of blackthorn may be called "sloe berries",‍ but botanically are small stone fruits or drupes, like plums or apricots.

Junipers and yews are commonly said to have berries, but these plants do not produce botanical fruits at all: they are gymnosperms, specifically conifers, not angiosperms (flowering plants). Their "berries" are highly-modified seed-bearing cones. In juniper berries, used to flavour gin, the cone scales, which are hard and woody in most conifers, are instead soft and fleshy when ripe. The bright red berries of yews consist of a fleshy outgrowth (aril) almost enclosing the poisonous seed. The resemblance of these plant structures to botanical berries provides a striking example of convergent evolution in different plant clades.

== Cultivation ==
Rubus berries have been crossbred to create a diverse range of brambleberries with desirable traits

Strawberries have been grown in gardens in Europe since the 14th century.‍ Blueberries were domesticated starting in 1911, with the first commercial crop in 1916.‍ Huckleberries of all varieties are not fully domesticated. Many other varieties of Vaccinium are likewise not domesticated.

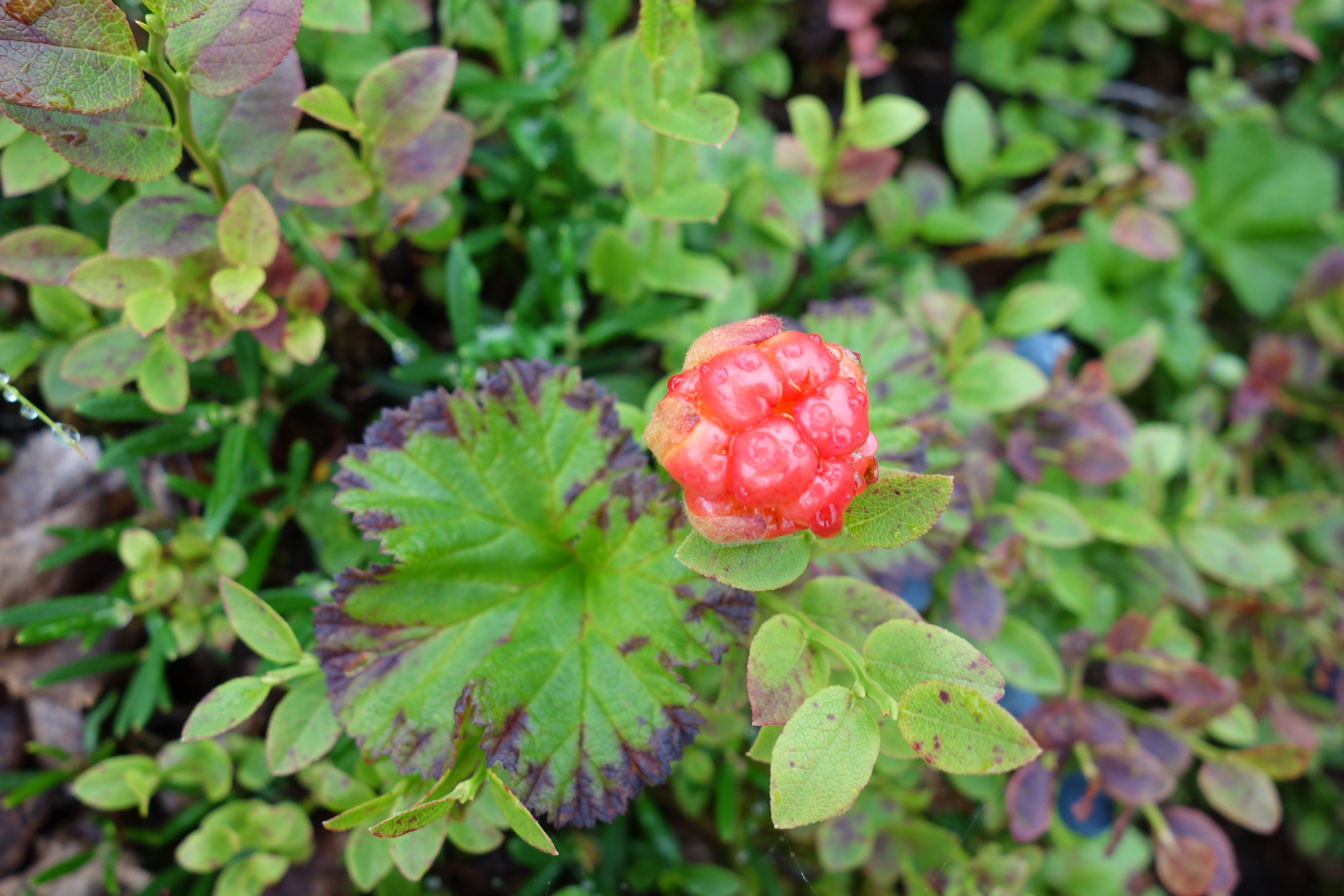
Cloudberry, common flowering plant in the cool temperate regions, alpine and arctic tundra and boreal forest.‍

=== Agricultural methods ===
Like most other food crops, berries are commercially grown, with both conventional pest management and integrated pest management (IPM) practices.‍^{:5}

Many soft fruit berries require a period of temperatures between 0 and 10 °C (32 and 50 °F) for breaking dormancy. In general, strawberries require 200–300 hours, blueberries 650–850 hours, blackberries 700 hours, raspberries 800–1,700 hours, currants and gooseberries 800–1,500 hours, and cranberries 2,000 hours.‍ However, too low a temperature will kill the crops: blueberries do not tolerate temperatures below −29 °C (−20 °F), raspberries, depending on variety, may tolerate as low as −31 °C (−24 °F), and blackberries are injured below −20 °C (−4 °F).‍ Spring frosts are, however, much more damaging to berry crops than low winter temperatures. Sites with moderate slopes (3%–5%), facing north or east in the Northern Hemisphere, near large bodies of water, which regulate spring temperature, are considered ideal in preventing spring frost injury to the new leaves and flowers.‍ All berry crops have shallow root systems.‍ Many US land-grant university extension offices suggest that strawberries should not be planted more than five years on the same site, due to the danger of black root rot (though many other illnesses go by the same name), which in the past has been controlled in major commercial production by annual methyl bromide fumigation but which is largely prohibited now.‍ Besides the number of years in production, soil compaction, the frequency of fumigation, and herbicide usages increase the appearance of black root rot in strawberries.‍ Raspberries, blackberries, strawberries, and many other berries are susceptible to verticillium wilt. Blueberries and cranberries grow poorly if the clay or silt content of the soil is more than 20%, while most other berries tolerate a wide range of soil types.‍ For most berry crops, the ideal soil is well drained sandy loam, with a pH of 6.2–6.8 and a moderate to high organic content; however, blueberries have an ideal pH of 4.2–4.8 and can be grown on muck soils, while blueberries and cranberries prefer poorer soils with lower cation exchange, lower calcium, and lower levels of phosphorus.‍

Growing most berries organically requires the use of proper crop rotation, the right mix of cover crops, and the cultivation of the correct beneficial microorganisms in the soil.‍ As blueberries and cranberries thrive in soils that are not hospitable to most other plants, and conventional fertilizers are toxic to them, the primary concern when growing them organically is bird management.‍

Postharvest small fruit berries are generally stored at 90%–95% relative humidity and 0 °C (32 °F).‍ Cranberries, however, are frost sensitive, and should be stored at 3 °C (37 °F).‍ Blueberries are the only berries that respond to ethylene, but flavor does not improve after harvest, so they require the same treatment as other berries. Removal of ethylene may reduce disease and spoilage in all berries.‍ Precooling within one to two hours post-harvest to storage temperature, generally 0 °C (32 °F), via forced air cooling increases the storage life of berries by about a third.‍ Under optimum storage conditions, raspberries and blackberries last for two to five days, strawberries 7–10 days, blueberries two to four weeks, and cranberries two to four months.‍ Berries can be shipped under high carbon dioxide or modified atmosphere of 10%–15% carbon dioxide for high carbon dioxide or 15%–20% carbon dioxide and 5%–10% oxygen for a modified atmosphere container to increase shelf life and prevent grey mold rot.‍

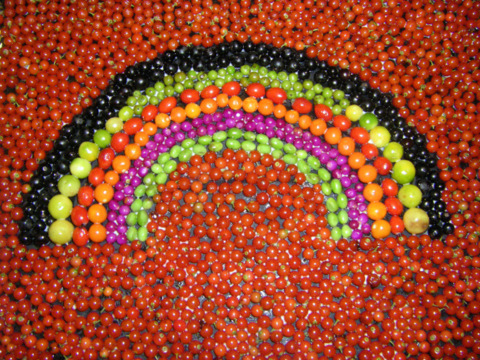
Example of color contrast in (mostly inedible) wild berries

=== Breeding ===
Several discoveries in the science of breeding berries were made in the 18th century by Antoine Nicolas Duchesne in his work on strawberries.‍ In the traditional technique of plant breeding, berries with specific desirable characteristics were chosen and allowed to sexually reproduce with other berries, and offspring with improved traits could then be selected and used for further crossing. Plants may be hybridized with different species within the same genus; hybridization between different genus may also be possible, but more difficult. Breeding may seek to increase the size and yield of the fruit, improve the flavor and quality of its nutrient content, such as antioxidants, expand the harvest season, and produce cultivars with resistance to diseases, tolerance of hot or cold conditions, and other desirable traits.‍ Advancements in molecular biology and genetic engineering allow for a more efficient and better targeted approach in the selection for a desirable genotype, via marker-assisted selection, for example.‍ Genetic modification techniques can also be used for breeding berries.‍

=== Horticultural soft fruit berries ===
Some fruit not commonly referred to as berries and not always botanically berries are included by US land-grant university extension offices in their guides for berry cultivation, or in guides for identifying local wild edible and non-edible berries. Examples include beach plums,‍ American persimmons, pawpaws, Pacific crabapples, and prickly pears.‍

== Commercial production ==
=== Economics ===
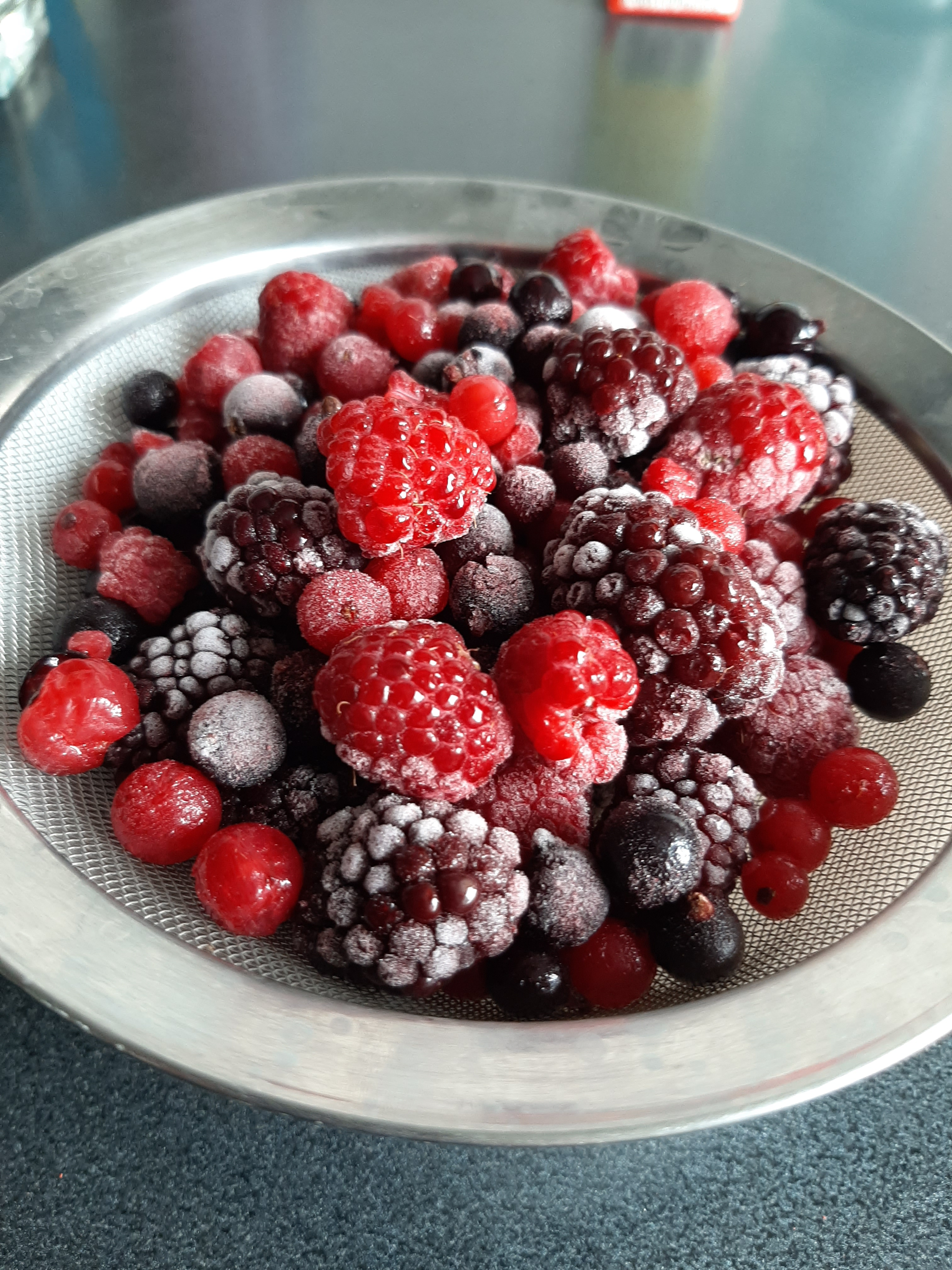
Mixed frozen berries

In certain regions, berrypicking can be a large part of the economy, and it is becoming increasingly common for western European countries such as Sweden and Finland to import cheap labor from Thailand or Bulgaria to do berry picking.‍ This practice has come under scrutiny in the past years because of the low wages and poor living standard for the "berry-pickers", as well as the lack of worker safety.‍

In the late 2010s in the US, reduced migration from Mexico and Central America and increased minimum wage standards have made finding "stoop-work" labourers to pick the strawberry crop difficult and costly.‍

== Phytochemicals and color ==
Once ripened, berries have a contrasting color to their background (often of green leaves), making them visible and attractive to frugivorous animals and birds.‍ This assists the wide dispersal of the plants' seeds.‍

Berry colors are due to natural phytochemicals, including plant pigments, such as anthocyanins, together with other flavonoids localized mainly in berry skins, seeds and leaves.‍ Although berry pigments have antioxidant properties in vitro,‍ there is no physiological evidence established to date that berry pigments have actual antioxidant or any other functions within the human body.‍ Consequently, it is not permitted to claim that foods containing polyphenols have antioxidant health value on product labels in the US or Europe.‍

== Culinary significance ==
=== Use in baked goods ===
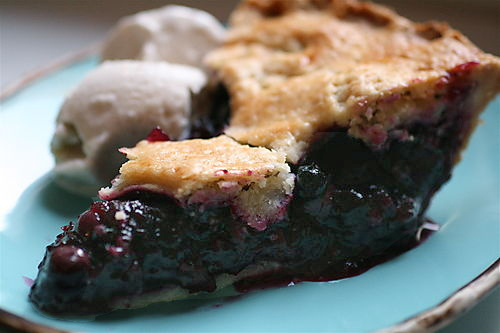
Blueberry

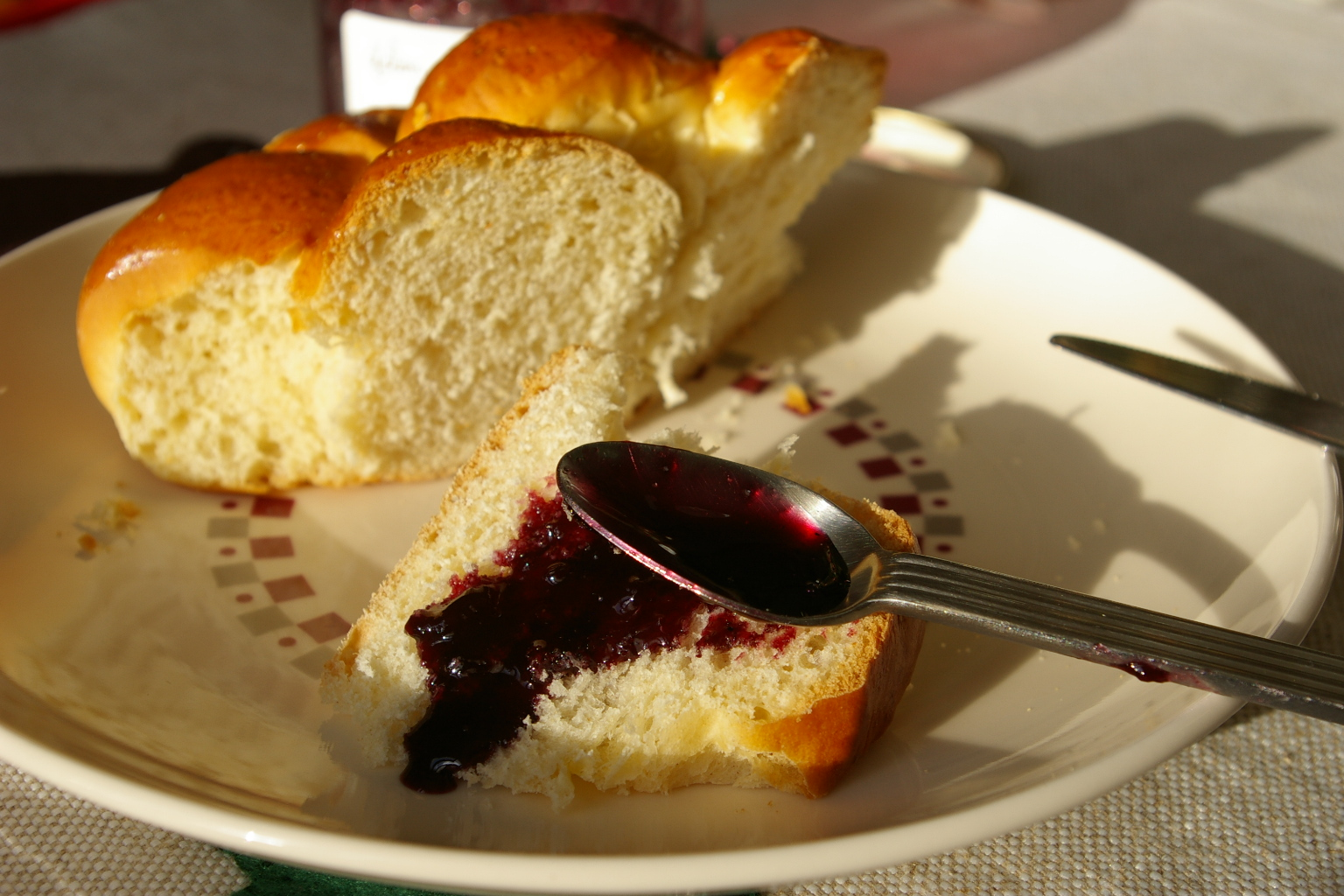
Elderberry

Berries are commonly used in pies or tarts, such as blueberry pie, blackberry pie, and strawberry pie.

Berries are often used in baking, such as blueberry muffins, blackberry muffins, berry cobblers, berry crisps, berry cakes, berry buckles, berry crumb cakes, berry teacakes, and berry cookies.‍ Berries are commonly incorporated whole into the batter for baking, and care is often taken so as to not burst the berries. Frozen or dried berries may be preferable for some baked berry products.‍ Fresh berries are also often incorporated into baked berry desserts, sometimes with cream, either as a filling to the dessert or as a topping.‍

=== Beverages ===
Berries are often added to water and/or juiced, as in cranberry juice, which accounts for 95% of cranberry crop usage,‍ blueberry juice, raspberry juice, goji berry juice, acai juice, aronia berry juice, and strawberry juice.‍ Wine is the principal alcoholic beverage made from berries (grapes). Fruit wines are commonly made out of other berries. In most cases, sugars must be added to the berry juices in the process of chaptalization to increase the alcohol content of the wine.‍ Examples of fruit wines made from berries include: elderberry wine, strawberry wine, blueberry wine, blackberry wine, redcurrant wine, huckleberry wine, goji wine and cranberry wine.‍ Berries are used in some styles of beer, particularly framboise (made with raspberry) and other fruit lambics.

=== Dried ===
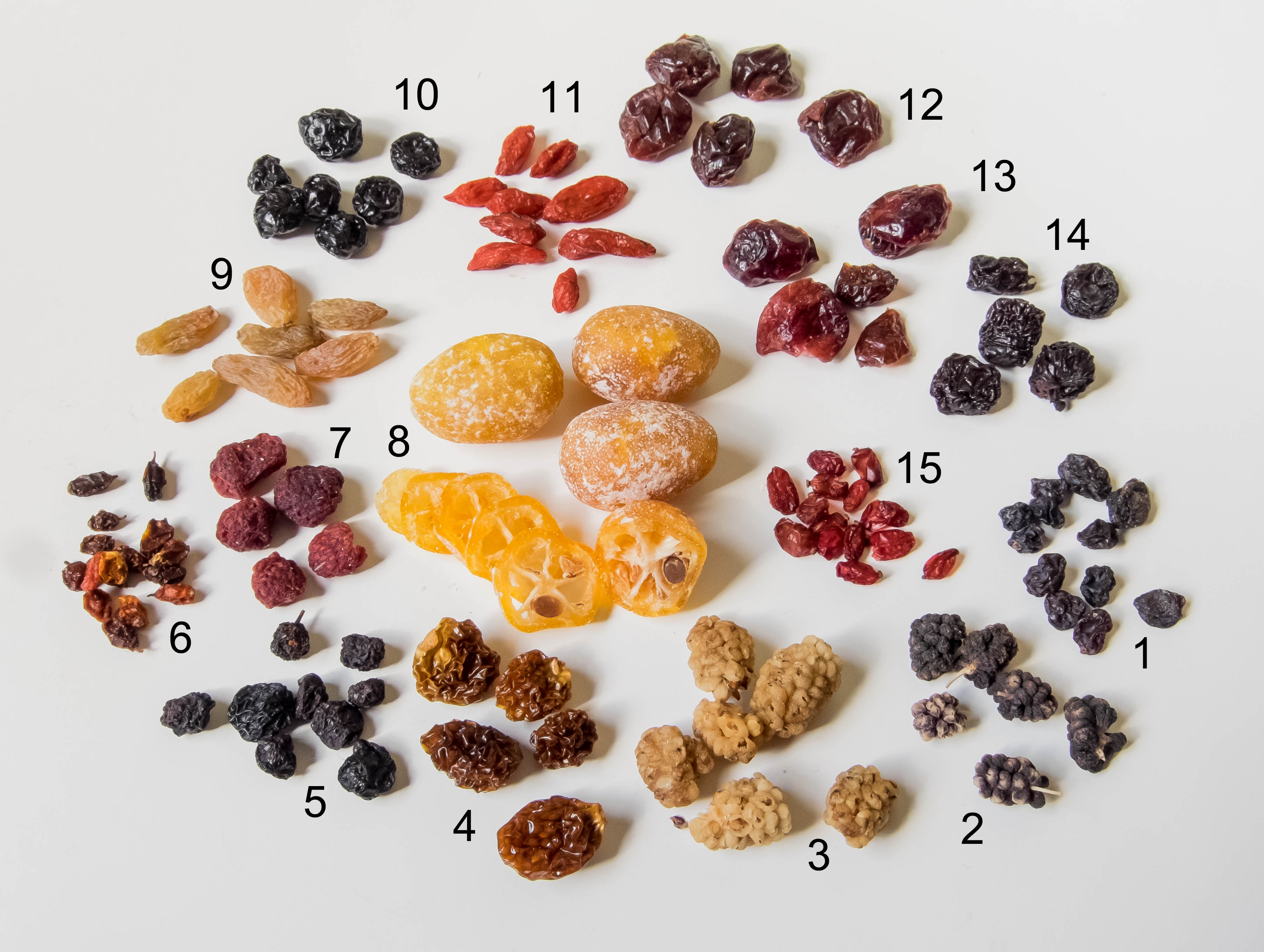
Various dried berries

Currants, raisins and sultanas are examples of dried grape berries, and many other commercially important berries are available in dried form.

=== Fruit preserves ===
Berries are perishable fruits with a short shelf life, and are often preserved by drying, freezing, pickling or making fruit preserves. Berries such as blackberry, blueberry, boysenberry, lingonberry, loganberry,‍ raspberry, and strawberry are used in jams and jellies. In the United States, Native Americans were "the first to make preserves from blueberries".‍

=== Other usages ===
Chefs have created quick pickled soft fruit, such as blackberries,‍ strawberries,‍ and blueberries.‍ Strawberries can be battered and quickly fried in a deep fryer.‍ Sauces made from berries, such as cranberry sauce, can be frozen until hard, battered, and deep fried.‍ Cranberry sauce is a traditional food item for Thanksgiving, and similar sauces can be made from many other berries such as blueberries, raspberries, blackberries, and huckleberries.‍

== In culture ==
=== Dye ===
Berries have been used in some cultures for dyeing. Many berries contain juices that can easily stain, affording use as a natural dye. For example, blackberries are useful for making dyes, especially when ripe berries can easily release juice to produce a colorfast effect.‍ Rubus berries, such as blackberry, raspberry, black raspberry, dewberry, loganberry, and thimbleberry all produce dye colors. These were once used by Native Americans.‍ In Hawaii, the native Hawaiian raspberry called ʻĀkala was used to dye tapa cloth with lavender and pink hues, whereas berries from the dianella lily were used for blue coloration, and berries from the black nightshade were used to produce green coloration.‍

== Research ==
Berry consumption is under basic research for the potential to improve nutrition and affect chronic diseases.‍ A 2016 meta-analysis found that berry consumption may be able to lower body mass index, low density lipoprotein and systolic blood pressure.‍

== See also ==
- List of berries
