= Bouvrage =

Soft drink from Scotland

Bouvrage was a soft drink produced by Ella Drinks Limited near Brechin, Angus, Scotland. The original Bouvrage was made with raspberry juice (as well as lightly carbonated water, sugar, citric acid and flavourings). The company introduced two other drinks, one made with blaeberries and the other with strawberries.

The drink was generally sampled at food fairs in Scotland and is sold at delicatessens and independent food stores.

Ella drinks suspended production and closed in 2024.
