= Crisp (dessert) =

Fruit-based American dessert

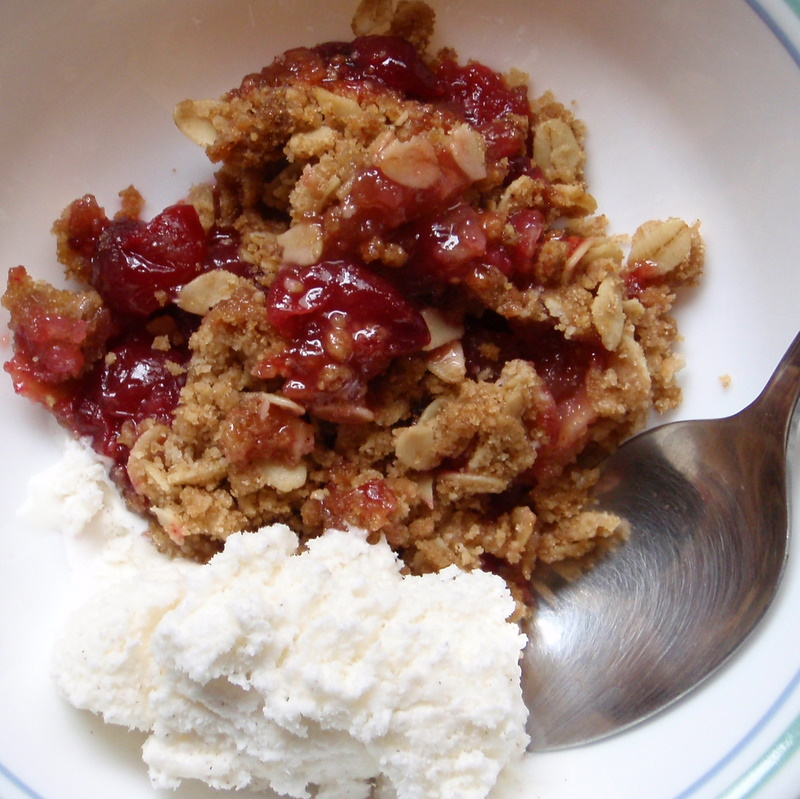
- Apple pear cranberry crisp
- Type: Dessert
- Main ingredients: Fruit, butter, flour, oats, brown sugar, spices (cinnamon, nutmeg)

A crisp is a type of American dessert, usually consisting of a type of fruit, baked with a crispy topping, hence the name. The topping usually consists of butter, flour, oats, brown sugar and usually spices, such as cinnamon and/or nutmeg. The most familiar type of crisp is apple crisp, where apples are baked with this topping. However, many other kinds of fruit can be used, such as cherries, pears, peaches, blueberries, etc. The dessert is similar to a crumble.

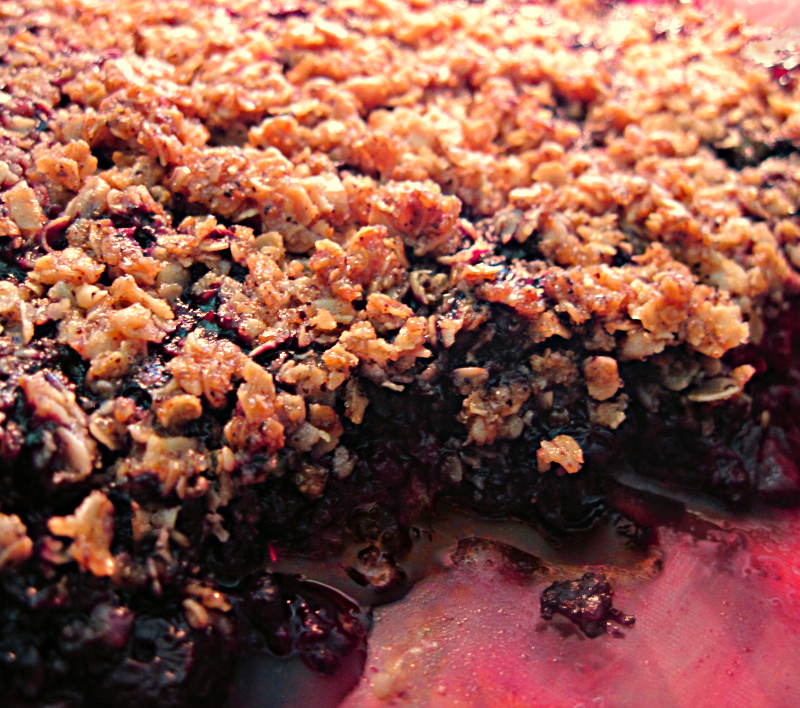
A crisp made with blueberries and raspberries

== History ==
Apple crisp specifically is a relatively modern dish. It is notably absent from the first edition of the Fannie Farmer Cookbook (1896), which is a comprehensive collection of American recipes. Variations of this dish are much older, for example, a recipe for apple pandowdy is in Miss Corson's Practical American Cookery, 1886.

The first reference to apple crisp specifically in print occurs in Good Housekeeping in September 1915. Apple crisp also made an appearance in a newspaper article in the Appleton Post Crescent on December 9, 1924.

The fruit crisp is a dessert that has gained widespread consumption in the United States and Canada. Its preparation typically relies on seasonal availability; while apple is the most common filling, other variations include rhubarb in spring, berries such as gooseberries and raspberries in summer, and plums or pears in autumn.

== See also ==
- Apple crumble
- Cobbler (food)
- Dumpling
- Pie
- Tart
- List of desserts
