= Cobbler (food) =

Baked dish resembling a pie

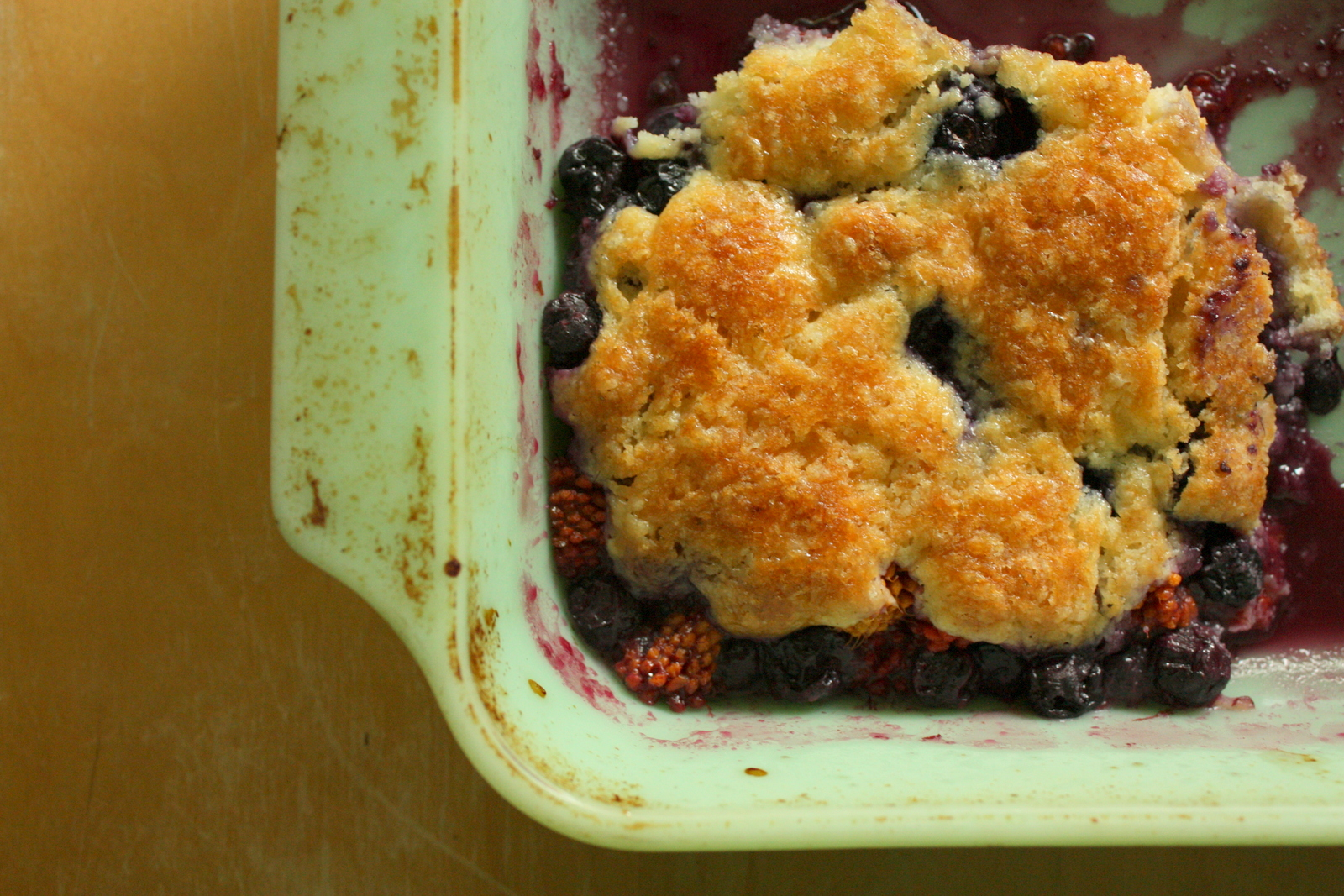
- Berry cobbler
- Place of origin: United States
- Main ingredients: batter or biscuit; fruit or savory filling
- Variations: Betty, grunt, slump, buckle, sonker, boot

Cobbler is a dessert or savory dish consisting of a fruit or savoury filling poured into a large baking dish and covered with a batter, biscuit, or dumpling (in the United Kingdom) before being baked. Cobbler is part of the cuisine of the United Kingdom, Australia and United States. The Joy of Cooking said of the cobbler, "while neither tidy or shapely, it is indisputably delicious", while The Washington Post said the phrase "as American as apple pie" should really be "as American as a cobbler".

== History ==
In the United States, English settlers were unable to make traditional suet puddings due to lack of suitable ingredients and cooking equipment. Using Dutch ovens, the settlers covered a stewed filling with a layer of pastry. Later versions were instead covered with a layer of uncooked plain biscuits, scone batter or dumplings, fitted together. The first recorded recipe for a cobbler is possibly in the 1839 book The Kentucky Housewife by Lettice Bryant, where it is called a "Peach Pot Pie or Cobler". The origin of the name cobbler is uncertain: it may be related to the archaic word cobeler, meaning "wooden bowl", or the term may be due to the topping having the visual appearance of a 'cobbled' stone pathway.

Cobblers and crumbles were promoted by the Ministry of Food in the United Kingdom during the Second World War, since they are filling, yet require less butter than a traditional pastry, and can be made with margarine.

== Regional variations ==
=== North America ===
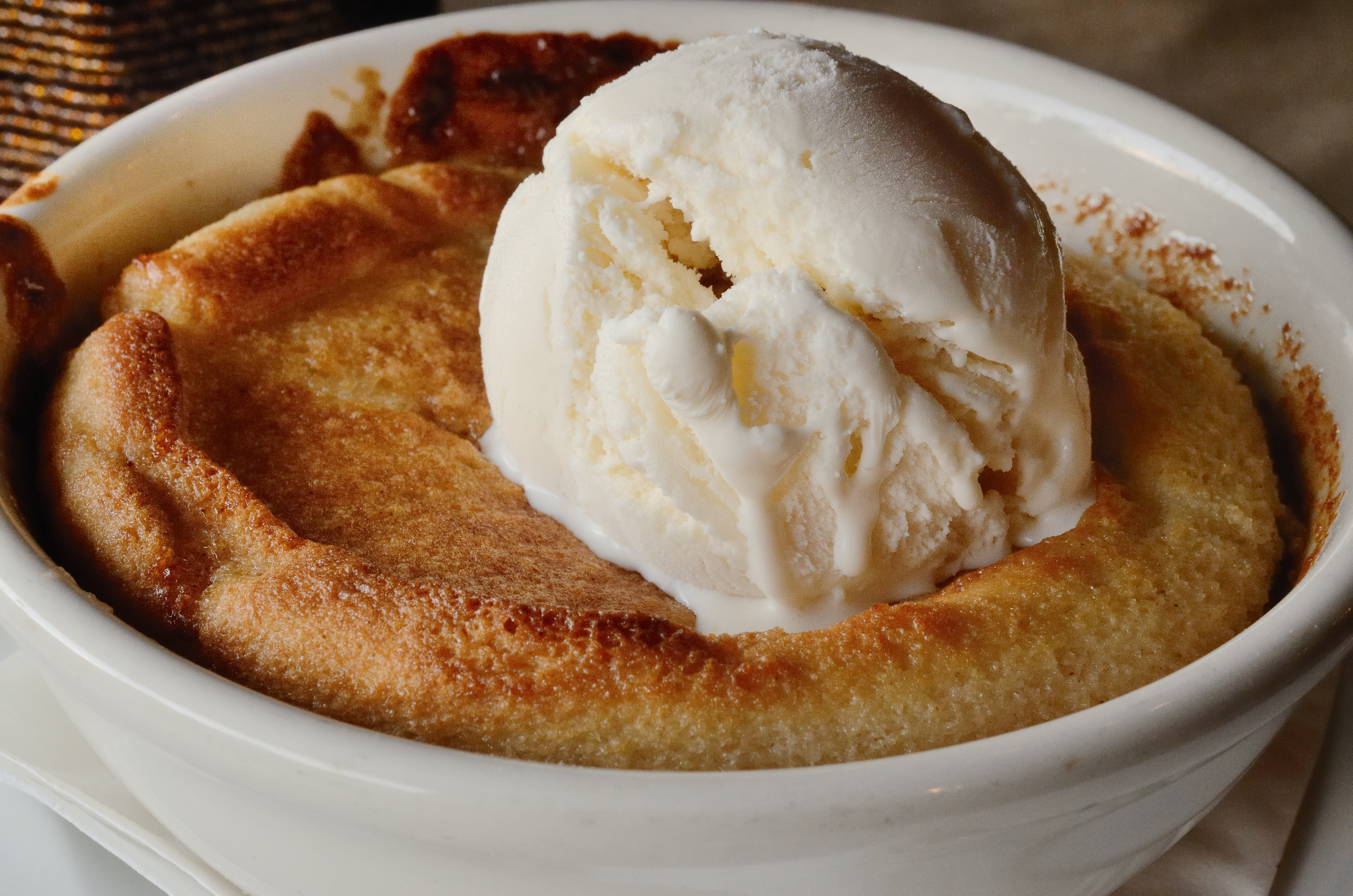
Peach cobbler with ice cream

Grunts, pandowdy, and slumps are Canadian Maritimes, New England and Pennsylvania Dutch (Apple Pan Dowdy) varieties of cobbler, typically cooked on the stovetop, or in an iron skillet or pan, with the dough on top in the shape of dumplings. They reportedly take their name from the grunting sound they make while cooking.

In the United States, additional varieties of cobbler include the apple pan dowdy (an apple cobbler whose crust has been broken and perhaps stirred back into the filling), the Betty (with sweetened crumbs placed in layers between the fruit), the buckle (made with yellow batter [like cake batter] with the filling mixed in with the batter), the dump (or dump cake), the grunt, the slump, and the sonker. The sonker is unique to North Carolina: it is a deep-dish version of the American cobbler.

Cobblers most commonly come in single fruit varieties and are named as such, e.g. blackberry, blueberry, and peach cobbler. The tradition also gives the option of topping the fruit cobbler with a scoop or two of vanilla ice cream. Savory cobblers are less common in the region; for example, tomato cobbler, which may include onion and a biscuit topping that may include cheese or cornmeal, is one savory variant that also resembles Southern tomato pie. Old California orchard cuisine features peach, pear, apricot, and, most prized by many, Black Tartarian cherry cobblers.

The Texas Legislature designated peach cobbler as the official cobbler of Texas in 2013.

Some cobbler recipes, especially in the American South, resemble a thick-crusted, deep-dish pie with both a top and bottom crust that lack leavening and are less cake-like.

=== UK and Commonwealth ===
In the UK and Commonwealth of Nations, the scone-topped cobbler predominates and is found in both sweet and savory versions. Common sweet fillings include apple, blackberry, strawberry, and peach. Savory versions, such as beef, lamb, or mutton, consist of a casserole filling, sometimes with a simple ring of cobbles around the edge, rather than a complete layer, to aid cooking of the meat. Cheese or herb scones may also be used as a savory topping.

== See also ==
- Apple crisp
- Brown Betty
- Crumble
- Pudding
- Dump cake
