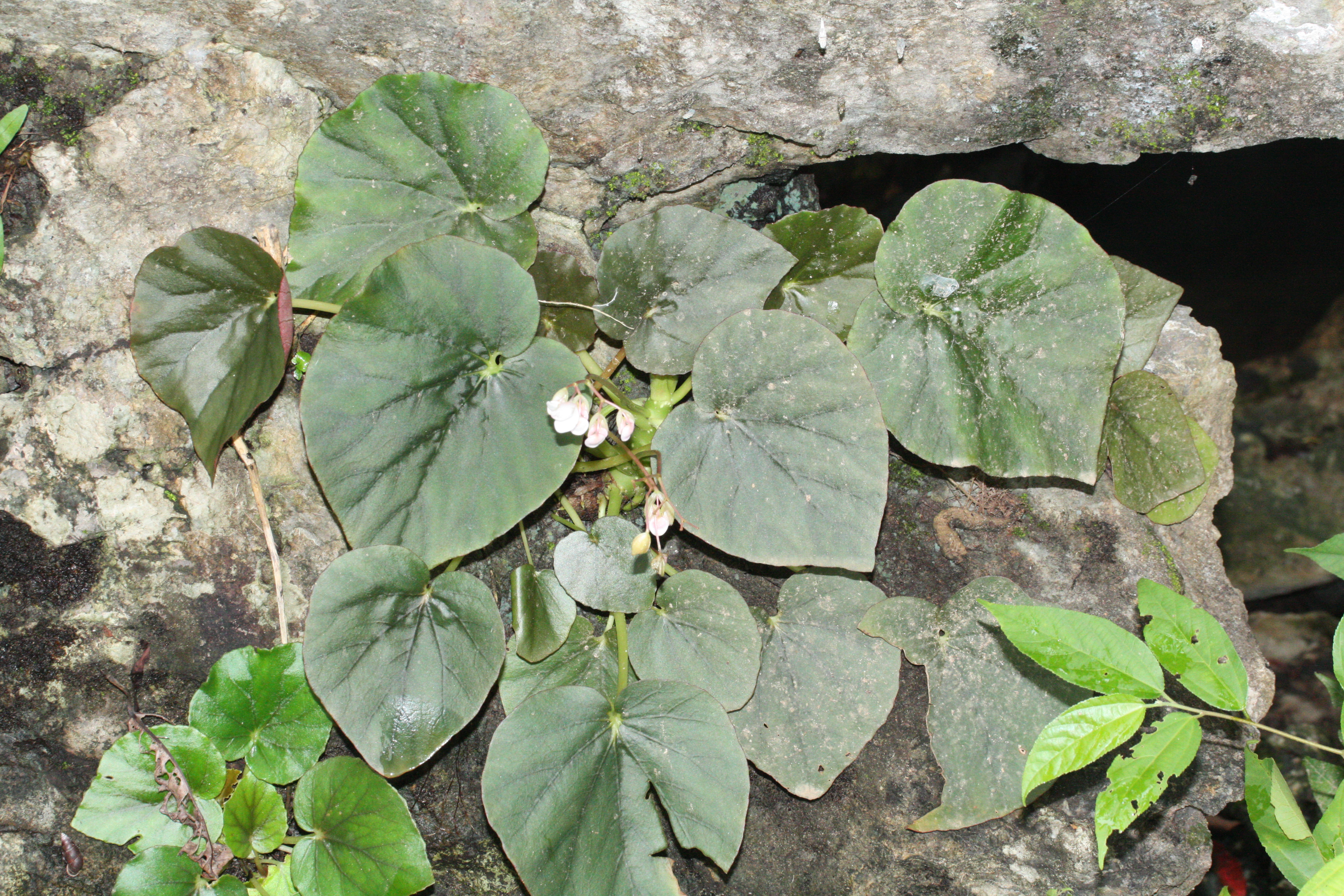

Scientific classification
- Kingdom: Plantae
- Clade: Tracheophytes
- Clade: Angiosperms
- Clade: Eudicots
- Clade: Rosids
- Order: Cucurbitales
- Family: Begoniaceae
- Genus: Begonia
- Species: B. elnidoensis

Binomial name
- Begonia elnidoensis C.I Peng & Rubite & C.W.Lin

= Begonia elnidoensis =

Species of flowering plant

Begonia elnidoensis is an endemic species of Begonia discovered in El Nido, Palawan, Philippines. The species was compared to Begonia wadei, in that both species have thick-trunked stem, differing in the widely to very widely ovate or subtriangular leaves, with the latter having obliquely ovate leaves, 3-4 secondary leaf veins where the latter has 6 on each side of the midrib, with glabrous petioles compared to latter having puberulous to tomentose, an inflorescence measuring 20–40 cm in length compared to only 6–20 cm, and the differently-sized bracts and capsules.

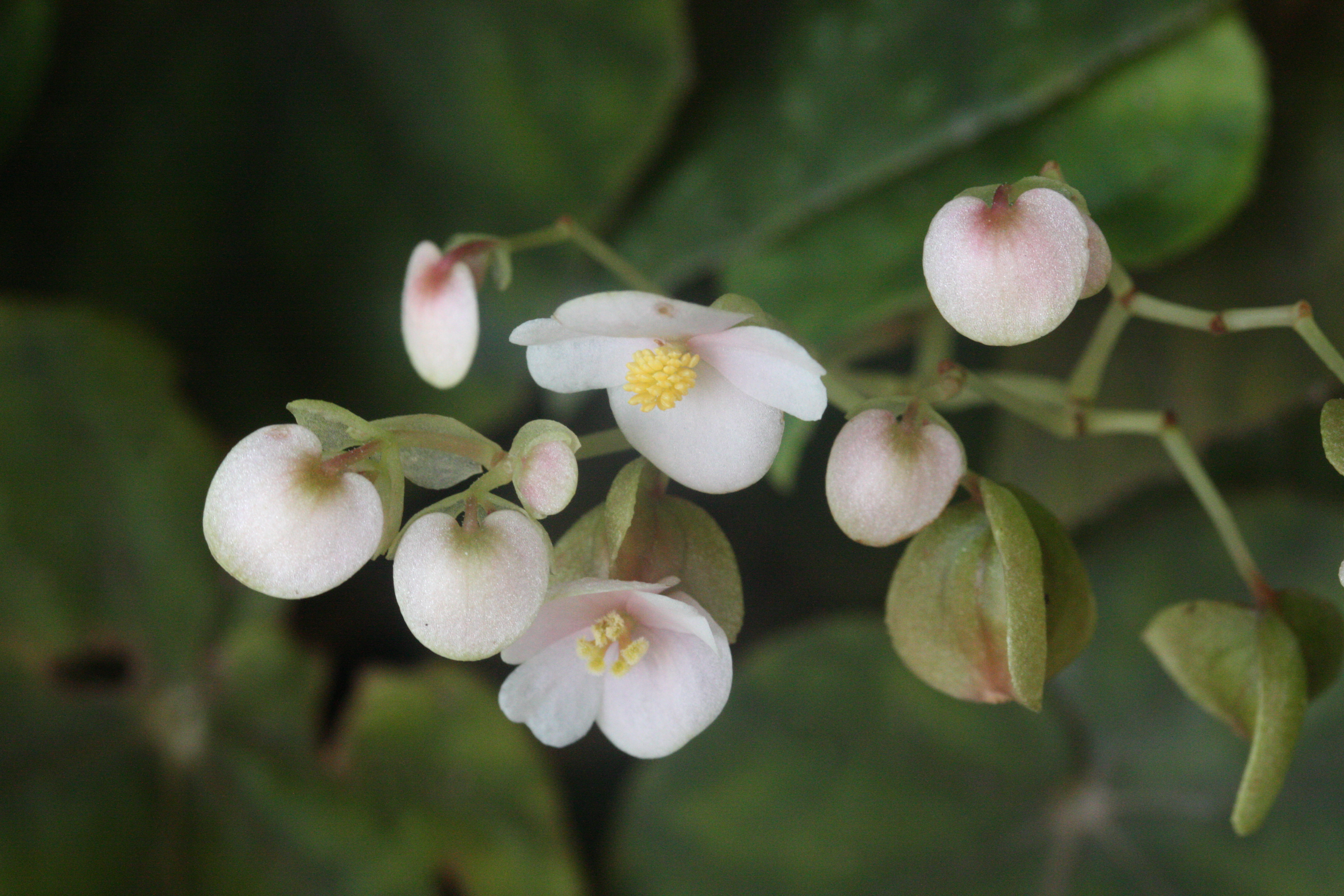
inflorescence of Brgonia elnidoensis

== Etymology ==
The specific epithet elnidoensis derives from El Nido, Palawan where the species was first discovered.
