= Busyador =

Person who harvests edible bird's nests

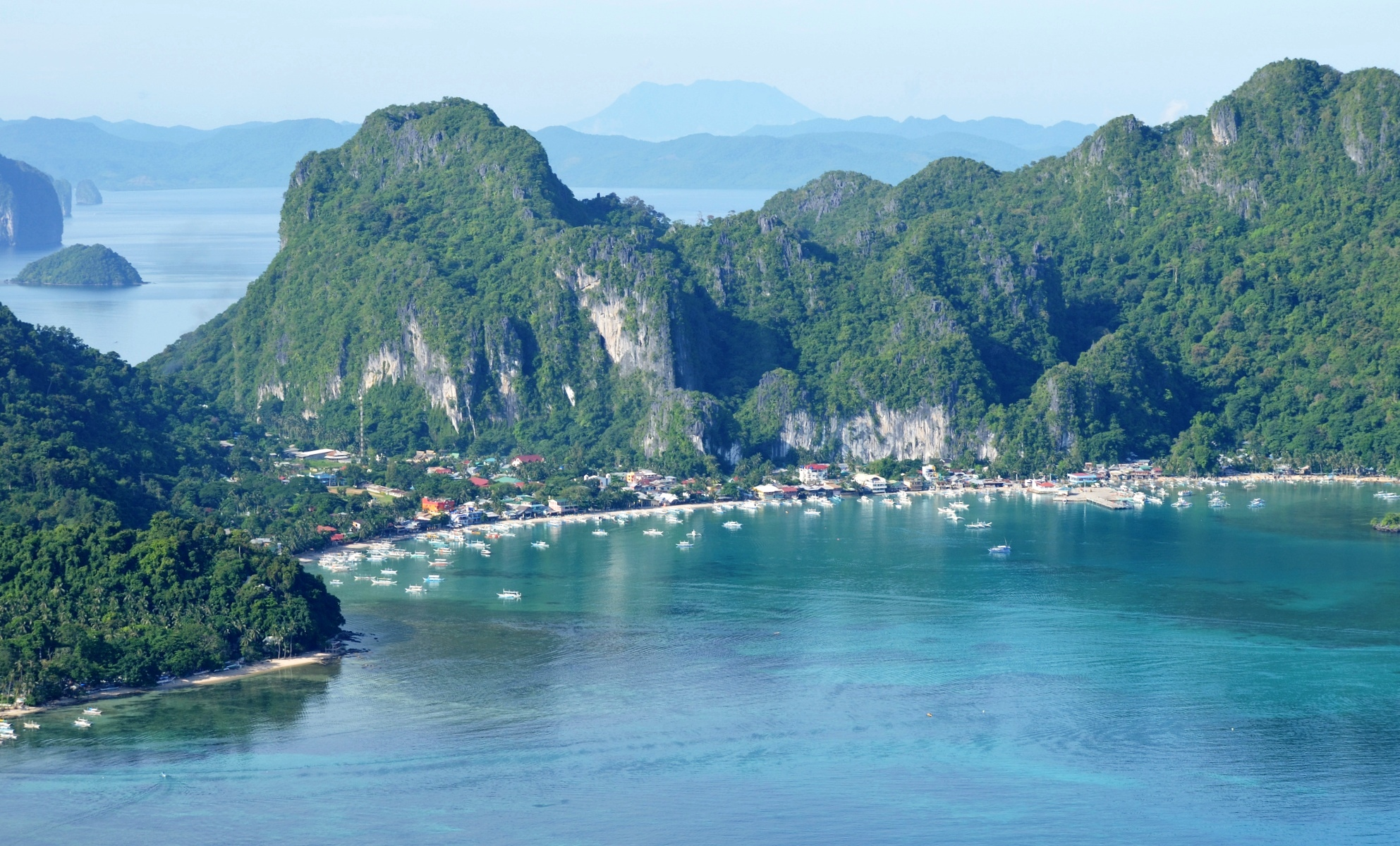
Busyadors often source edible bird's nests from the cliffs of El Nido, Palawan, the Philippines; along with the neighbouring municipality of Taytay, El Nido is considered "the center of the [edible bird's nest] trade"

A busyador or a swift nest collector is a person who harvests edible bird's nests (namely those created by edible-nest swiftlets, or Aerodramus fuciphagus) in Southeast Asia, and particularly in the Philippines. The nests are made of the birds' solidified saliva, and serve as the main ingredient of bird's nest soup, a delicacy of Chinese cuisine.

The practice of obtaining the swiftlet nests involves tracking the birds as they fly back to the karst caves and holes—known locally as butas—in which they build their nests, and scaling coastal cliffs to reach said nests, either without climbing aids or by using a system of climbing ropes or bamboo ladders and poles. The occupation has been described as "one of the most dangerous jobs in Asia", as it involves a near-constant risk of injury or death. Busyadors have also been reported to be subject to unfair working conditions, as well as dispossession from the caves in which they source the swiftlet nests.
