= El Nido, Palawan =

Municipality in Palawan, Philippines

El Nido Bacuit
- Municipality
- Municipality of El Nido
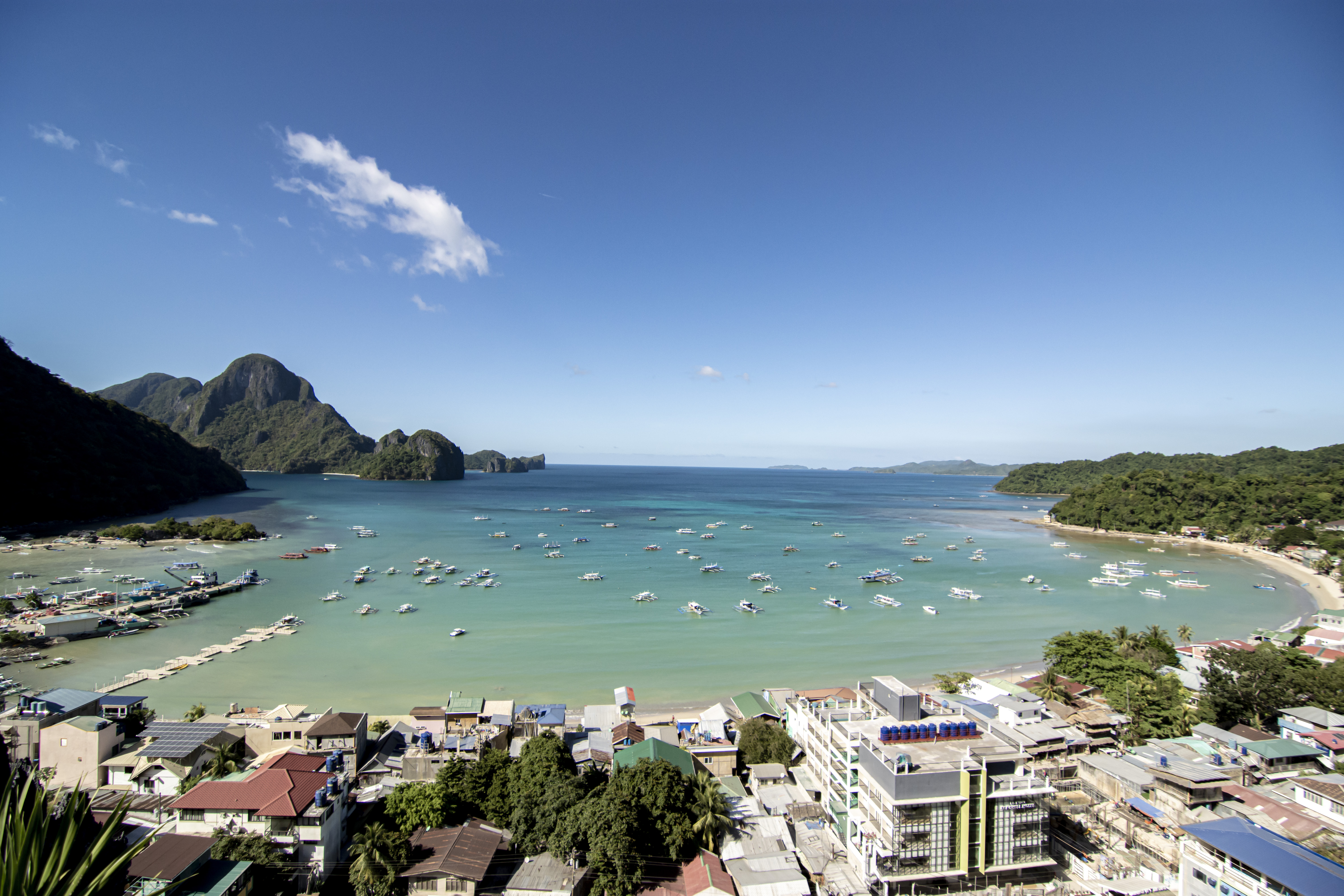
- View of El Nido

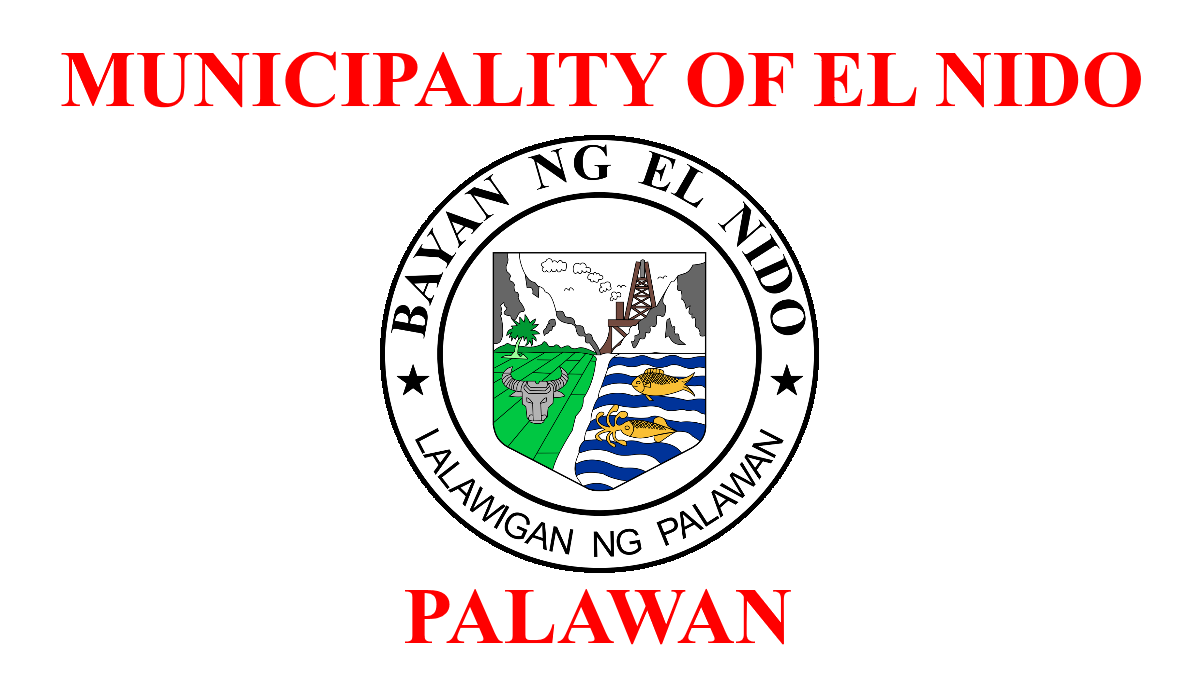
- Flag Seal

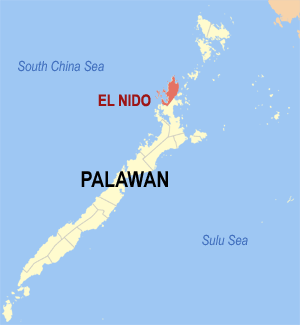
- Map of Palawan with El Nido highlighted
- Interactive map of El Nido
- Location within the Philippines
- Coordinates: 11°11′N 119°23′E
- Country: Philippines
- Region: Mimaropa
- Province: Palawan
- District: 1st district
- Founded: 1916
- Renamed: June 17, 1954
- Barangays: 18 (see Barangays)

Government
  - Type: Sangguniang Bayan
  - Mayor: Edna G. Lim
  - Vice Mayor: Joel D. Rosento
  - Representative: Rosalie Salvame
  - Municipal Council: Members: Christine Nicole G. Lim; Geraldo B. Diaz; Bernardo D. Legaspi; Rosano G. Llanera; Mateo A. Cantuba; Jun M. Mones; Ednalyn B. Nangit; John Rostum T. Vidal
  - Electorate: 35,137 voters (2025)

Area
  - Total: 923.26 km^{2} (356.47 sq mi)
- Elevation: 35 m (115 ft)
- Highest elevation: 596 m (1,955 ft)
- Lowest elevation: 0 m (0 ft)

Population (2024 census)
  - Total: 51,367
  - Density: 55.637/km^{2} (144.10/sq mi)
  - Households: 12,632

Economy
  - Income class: 1st municipal income class
  - Poverty incidence: 12.16% (2023)
  - Revenue: ₱ 691.1 million (2024)
  - Assets: ₱ 2,236 million (2024)
  - Expenditure: ₱ 504.1 million (2024)
  - Liabilities: ₱ 745.6 million (2024)

Service provider
  - Electricity: Palawan Electric Cooperative (PALECO)
- Time zone: UTC+8 (PST)
- ZIP code: 5313
- PSGC: 1705312000
- IDD : area code: +63 (0)48
- Native languages: Palawano; Tagalog
- Website: www.elnidopalawan.gov.ph

El Nido (Spanish for 'The Nest'), officially the Municipality of El Nido (Cuyonon: Banwa i'ang El Nido, Tagalog: Bayan ng El Nido), is a municipality in the province of Palawan, Philippines. According to the 2024 census, it has a population of 51,367 people.

A managed resource protected area, it is known for its white-sand beaches, coral reefs, and limestone cliffs, as well as for being the gateway to the Bacuit archipelago.

== Etymology ==
According to a folktale, a group of Spaniards arrived and asked for the name of the place. It was said that during that time, the inhabitants of the area were Tagalogs. Without understanding the Spaniards, the Tagalogs replied, "Bakit?" The Spaniards, thinking that word was the answer to their question, named the place "Bacuit".

== History ==
=== Prehistory ===
El Nido, also known as Bacuit, has been inhabited by humans since at least 2800 BC around the Bacuit Bay area, and at Dewil Valley possibly as early as 14,000 years ago. This was confirmed by fossils and burial sites dating back to the Late Neolithic Age that can be found in many caves and excavation sites surrounding the municipality, particularly in Dewil Valley's Ille Cave in New Ibajay.

=== Spanish era ===
The town traces its roots to a small Tagbanwa village called Talindak in modern-day Langeb-langeban, however near it was one of the largest Tagbanua communities in El Nido called Batacalan, located in modern-day Sibaltan.

In the 16th century, the Spaniards arrived in the area and discovered two sub-tribes of Tagbanua in the region; the Tandulanen and the Silanganen. The Tandulanen were hostile and primitive and stayed in the interior while the Silanganen were more cooperative and assimilated within the Spanish territories. The Tandulanen as a result were able to preserve Tagbanua culture to this day.

Sometime afterwards within the same century, waves of migrants from Cuyo Islands settled in the area. In the 1800s, the Spaniards arrived and settled in the area where present-day Población and Mabini are located. The first Spanish families were the Canovas, Vázquez, Ríos, and Rey. In 1882, Talindak became a barrio of Taytay, which was the capital of the former Province of Calamianes from 1818, and the Province of Castilla, the area of what is now known as northern Palawan, from 1858.

In 1890, the Spaniards renamed it Bacuit. At the time, the center of the town was Cabigsing, then known as Inventario. Chinese families moved into the area about the same period, first settling in Langeblangeban. The first Chinese settlers were named Lim, Chin, Liao, Edsan, Ambao, Que-Ke, Lim Piao, Yu His, Pe Phan, and Pe Khen.

=== American era ===
It remained part of Taytay until 1916, when it formally became an independent municipality. The new municipality was then known as Bacuit.

=== Post-war independence ===
On June 17, 1954, Republic Act No. 1140 was approved, changing the name of the town from Bacuit to its present name, El Nido, after the edible nests of swiftlets (collocalia fuciphaga) found in the crevices of its limestone cliffs. These nests, nido in Spanish, the main ingredient for the gourmet nido soup, are being sold at approximately US$ 3,000 per kilogram.

In 1957, the following barrios were created:

- Villa Paz comprising the sitios of New Igabas, Candolay, Malapaho, Mabeñgeten, Dewel, Nalbekan, and Lapia;
- Bebeladan comprising the sitios of Mainlong, Bolabod, Balete, Culiong, Codongnon, Vigan, Pagawanen, Langeblangeban, Talulap, Bocboc, Miadiao, Avirawan, Pita, Deboluan, Balay-Bacaco, Kiminawit, Pamontonan, Simpian, Binabanan, Tegas, and Pinacpanacan;
- Bagong-Bayan comprising the sitios of Manogtog, Cadleman, Pinagtual, Omao, Nami, Tebey, Bato, Tuñgay, Cataaban, and Lomocob;
- Pasadeña comprising the sitios of Lamoro, Cagbatang, Bulalacao, Pinañganteñgan, Quinawañgan, Nagbaclao, Colantod, Loblob, and Badiang;
- Sibaltan comprising the sitios of Turatod, Buluang, Santa Monica, Senodioc, Laolao, Caboñgan, Tapic, Panian, Guitan, Loro, and Nagcalasag;
- Barotuan comprising the sitios of Taberna, Locaroc, Nagpan, Yocoton, Calitang, Wawa, Makinit, Canoling, Mabañgaon, and Mapeldeten;
- San Fernando comprising the sitios of Panian, Madorianen, Dipnay, Maubog, Guenleng, Palabuayan, Parañgaycayan, San Pablo, and Olac-olacan; and,
- Villa Libertad comprising the sitios of Calelenday, Taolili, Boloc, Inigtan, Mepague, Matolatolaon, Dao, Batbat, Madacotdacot, Nasigdan, Semenled, Bancalen, and Cagbanaba. In the same year, the barrio of Oton was renamed to Mabini.

== Geography ==
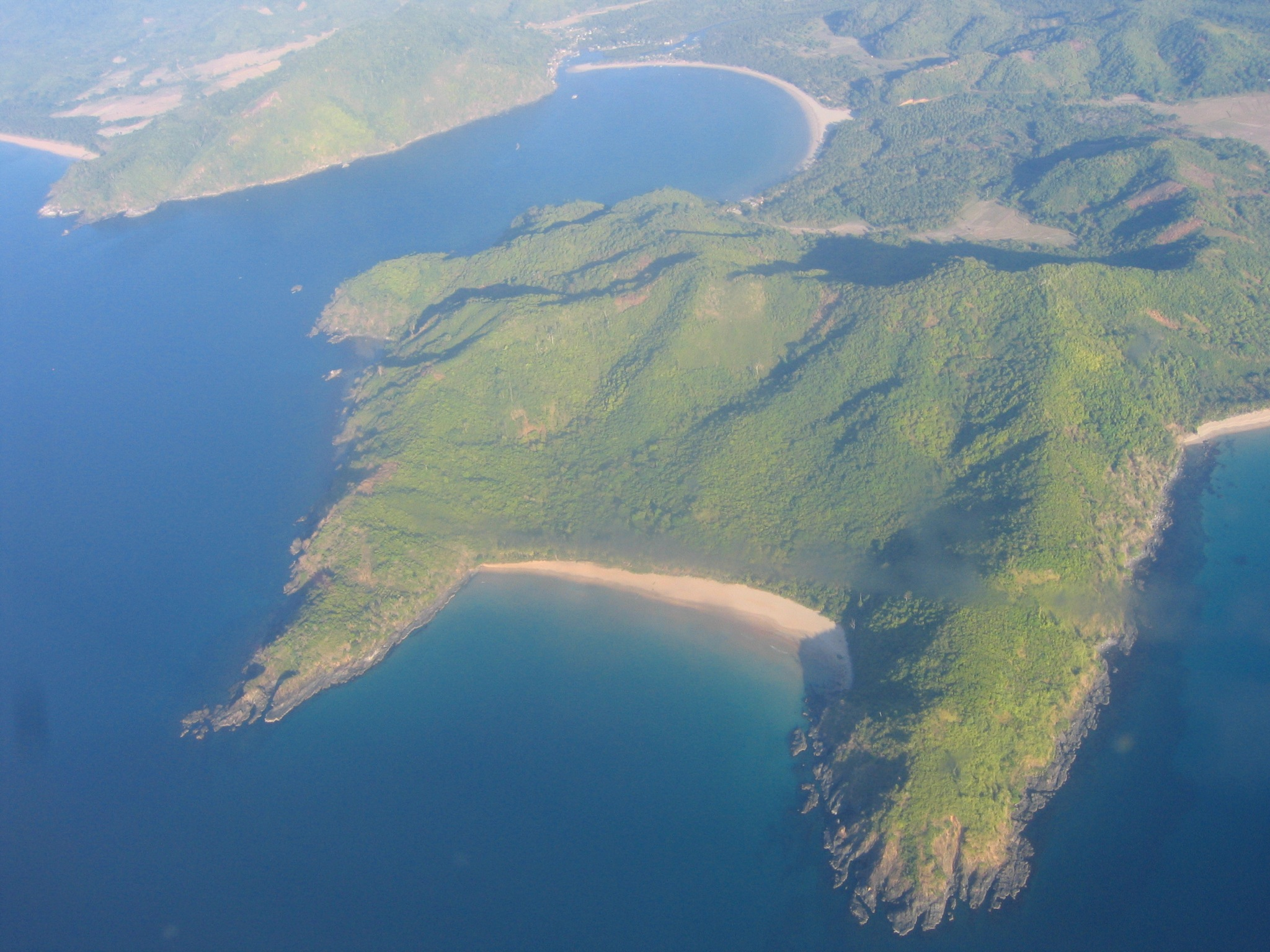
Aerial view of Bucana, in the northern part of El Nido

El Nido is situated in Bacuit Bay and covers a land area of 465.1 square kilometres (179.6 sq mi). It is in the northernmost tip of mainland Palawan and is bordered by the Linapacan Strait to the north, the Sulu Sea to the east, and the South China Sea to the west. El Nido includes 45 islands and islets, each with its own unique geological formations. The highest peak is at Cadlao Island, towering up to 640 metres (2,100 ft) above sea level.

Together with Sulu Archipelago, Sabah, and the South China Sea, El Nido, being part of Palawan, is located in the tectonically active and seismically active Sunda Plate, a plate that is entirely separate from the Philippine Mobile Belt to which the rest of the Philippines belongs. The Permian to Paleogene rocks and limestone cliffs of El Nido are similar to those that can be found in Ha Long Bay in Vietnam, Guilin in China, as well as Krabi in Thailand, all of which are part of the Sunda Plate.

El Nido is about 420 kilometres (260 mi) south-west of Manila, and 269 kilometres (167 mi) north-east of Puerto Princesa, capital of Palawan.

=== Barangays ===
El Nido is politically subdivided into eighteen barangays. Each barangay consists of puroks and some have sitios.

Four of these barangays are situated in the Población (town proper) and are also known by their respective zones.

- Bagong Bayan
- Buena Suerte (Zone II)
- Barotuan
- Bebeladan
- Corong-corong (Zone IV)
- Mabini (formerly Oton)
- Manlag
- Masagana (Zone III)
- New Ibajay
- Pasadeña
- Maligaya (Zone I)
- San Fernando
- Sibaltan
- Teneguiban
- Villa Libertad
- Villa Paz
- Bucana
- Aberawan

=== Climate ===
Climate data for El Nido, Palawan
Month	Jan	Feb	Mar	Apr	May	Jun	Jul	Aug	Sep	Oct	Nov	Dec	Year
Mean daily maximum °C (°F)	27 (81)	31 (88)	31 (88)	32 (90)	32 (90)	31 (88)	25 (77)	31 (88)	30 (86)	31 (88)	31 (88)	28 (82)	30 (86)
Mean daily minimum °C (°F)	22 (72)	23 (73)	23 (73)	24 (75)	25 (77)	25 (77)	20 (68)	24 (75)	23 (73)	24 (75)	24 (75)	23 (73)	23 (74)
Average rainfall mm (inches)	6 (0.2)	0 (0)	12 (0.5)	39 (1.5)	117 (4.6)	351 (13.8)	435 (17.1)	375 (14.8)	159 (6.3)	159 (6.3)	45 (1.8)	12 (0.5)	1,710 (67.4)
Average rainy days	2	1	3	4	17	25	26	24	20	19	9	4	154
Source: World Weather Online (modelled/calculated data, not measured locally)

The climate in El Nido is distinguished by two seasons: dry, from December to May, and wet, from June to November. April and May are typically the driest, while the heaviest rainfall occurs around August. The northeast wind blows from December to March, occasionally interchanging with the north wind from December to February. The southwest wind is felt from June to October, while the east wind, the mildest of all winds, blows during April and May.

The average temperature ranges from a low of 22 °C (72 °F) to a high of 33 °C (91 °F). The coolest temperatures are usually experienced during January, while the hottest temperatures are felt in April and May.

== Demographics ==
Population census of El Nido

Year	Pop.	±% p.a.
1918	1,789	—
1939	2,280	+1.16%
1948	2,306	+0.13%
1960	4,075	+4.86%
1970	7,358	+6.08%
1975	8,749	+3.53%
1980	11,657	+5.91%
1990	18,832	+4.91%

Year	Pop.	±% p.a.
1995	21,948	+2.91%
2000	27,029	+4.57%
2007	30,249	+1.56%
2010	36,191	+6.74%
2015	41,606	+2.69%
2020	50,494	+4.16%
2024	51,367	+0.41%

Source: Philippine Statistics Authority

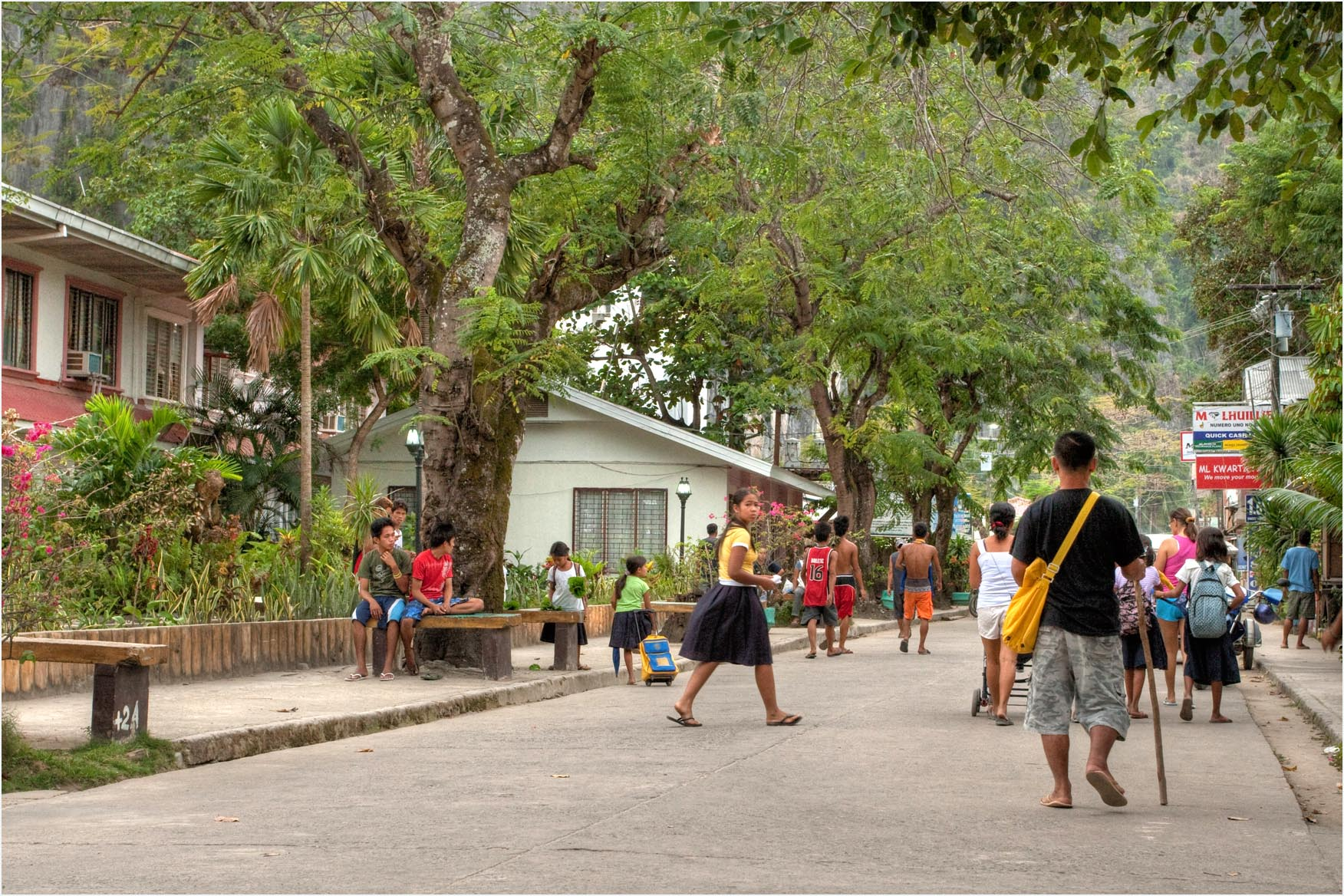
Calle Real in El Nido

In the 2024 census, the population of El Nido was 51,367 people, with a density of 56 inhabitants per square kilometre or 150 inhabitants per square mile.

The first town census of 1918 showed El Nido as having a population of 1,789. Between 1980 and 1990, the population grew to 18,832. Based on the 2000 census, the annual growth rate is 3.58%. This is higher than the average annual population growth rate for the whole country for the periods 1990 to 2000 and 2000 to 2007, which were only 2.34% and 2.04%, respectively.

According to the 2007 census, El Nido has a population of 30,249 people in 6,311 households in its eighteen barangays. Eighty-five percent of the population is living in rural barangays, while only fifteen percent of them are in the Población area.

=== Ethnic groups ===
The original settlers of El Nido were the Tagbanwas and Cuyunons. Throughout the centuries, there has been a constant migration of Tagalogs, Hiligaynon, Bicolanos, Ilocanos, Chinese, and Spaniards. There are also a small number of Japanese and Koreans. Intermarriage between ethnic and linguistic groups is not uncommon in El Nido.

=== Languages ===
The main language is Filipino (Tagalog). In addition, many people are very proficient in English, Hiligaynon, other Visayan languages, and Bicolano. A small but significant percentage of the population speaks or comprehends Cuyonon, the native language of the Cuyo Islands and most parts of Palawan.

== Economy ==
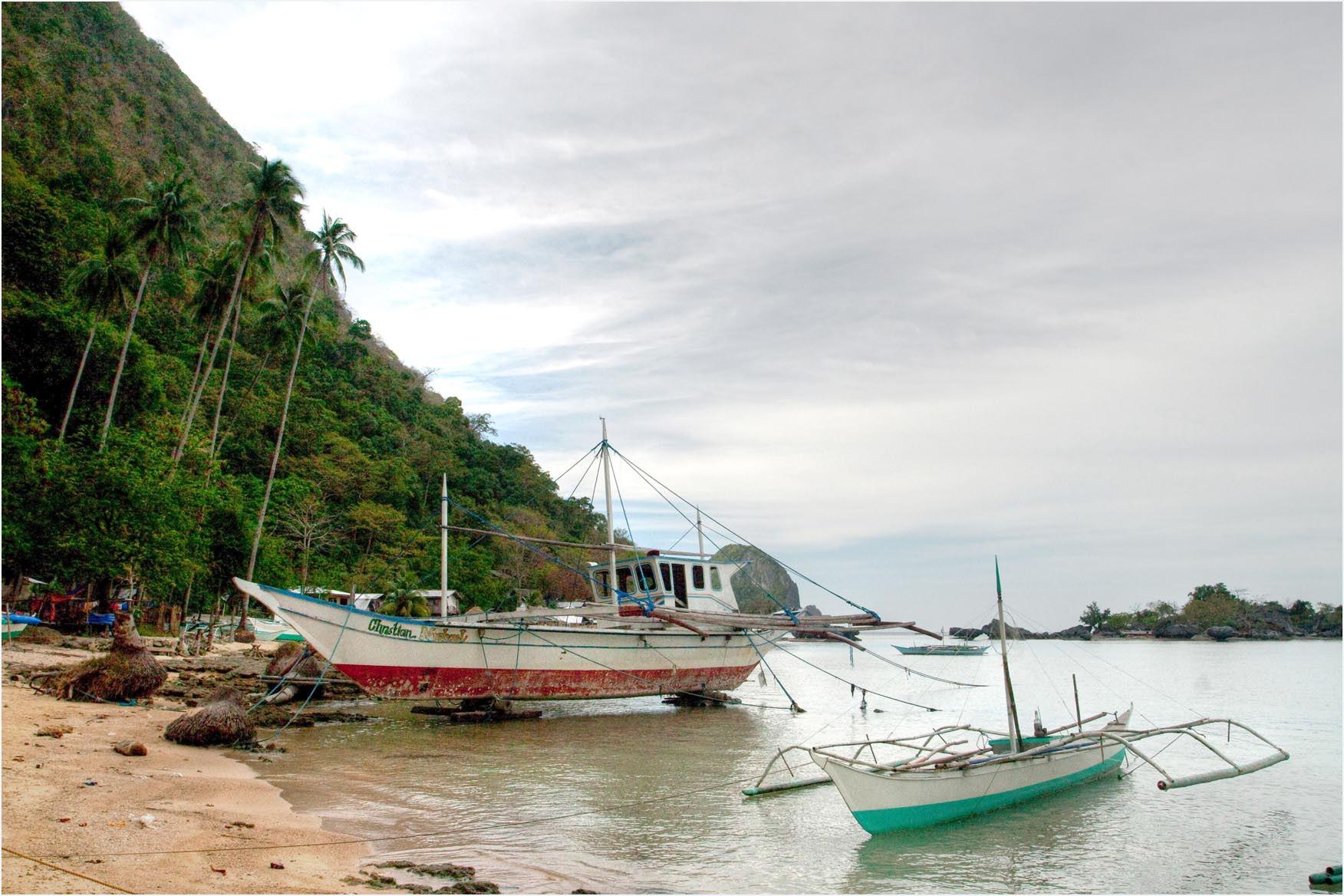
Fishing boats in El Nido

Poverty incidence of El Nido (%)

Source: Philippine Statistics Authority

The main industries of El Nido are fishing, agriculture and tourism, being a popular diving location. Edible nest-gathering is also an economic activity, although it is seasonal. Coconut, palay, cashew, banana, and mango are its major products.

As a tourist destination, El Nido has been included in Condé Nast Traveler's list of "20 Most Beautiful Beaches in the World," and CNNgo has called it the best beach and island destination in the Philippines for its "extraordinary natural splendor and ecosystem."

== Government ==
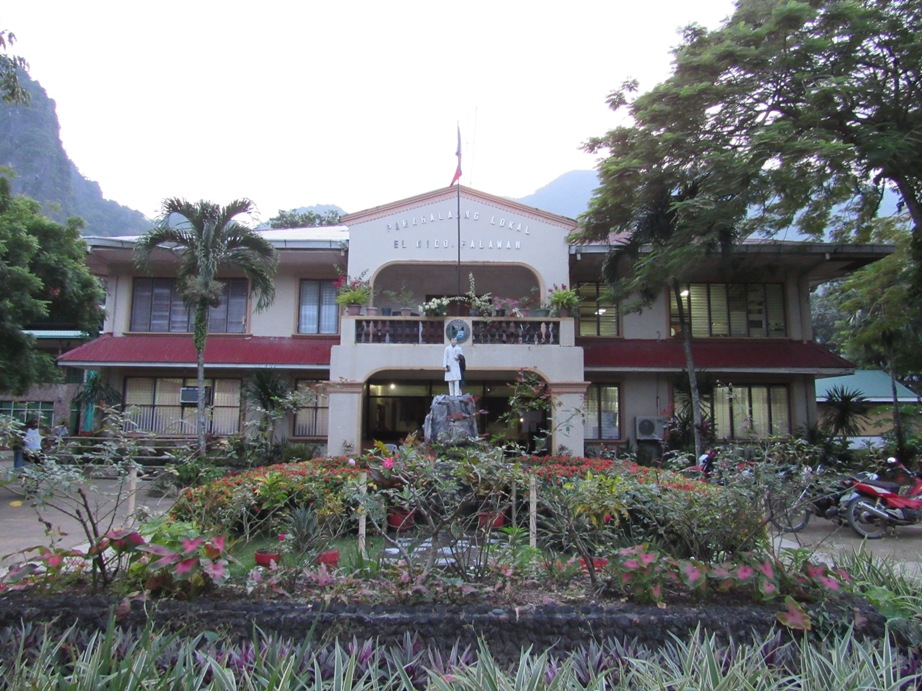
Municipal Hall

El Nido is governed by a mayor and a vice mayor, who are elected to three-year terms. The mayor is the executive head and leads the municipality's departments to execute the municipal ordinances and improve public services. The vice mayor heads the legislative council consisting of eight councilors, more commonly known as Sangguniang Bayan members. The municipal council is in charge of creating the municipality's policies in the form of ordinances and resolutions.

=== Seal ===
The municipal seal depicts a silhouette of the El Nido territory within an armor-shaped frame. The famous marble and limestone cliffs serve as nesting grounds for swiftlets. Behind it is the oil rig, representing the areas within its administrative boundaries that are found to be rich in oil and natural gas such as the Malampaya Sound, which is 50 kilometers within its borders, and the Cadlao Oilfield in the Bacuit Bay area. At the bottom of the picture is the rice field, with the carabao head superimposed at the center, and on the other side, the sea, with the fish and the squid situated in the middle, representing farming and fishing, the two main industries of its people.

== Protected area status ==
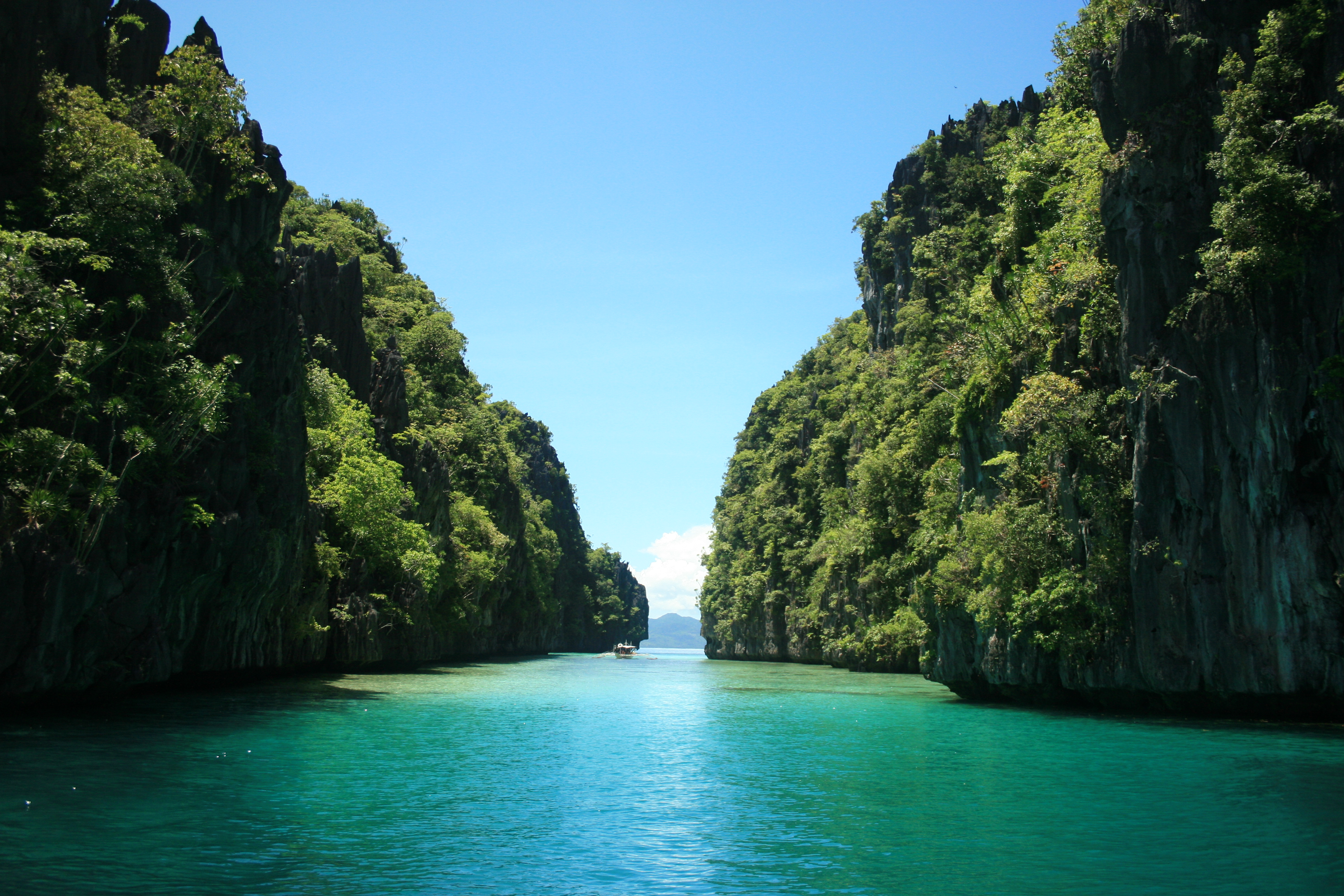
A lagoon in El Nido

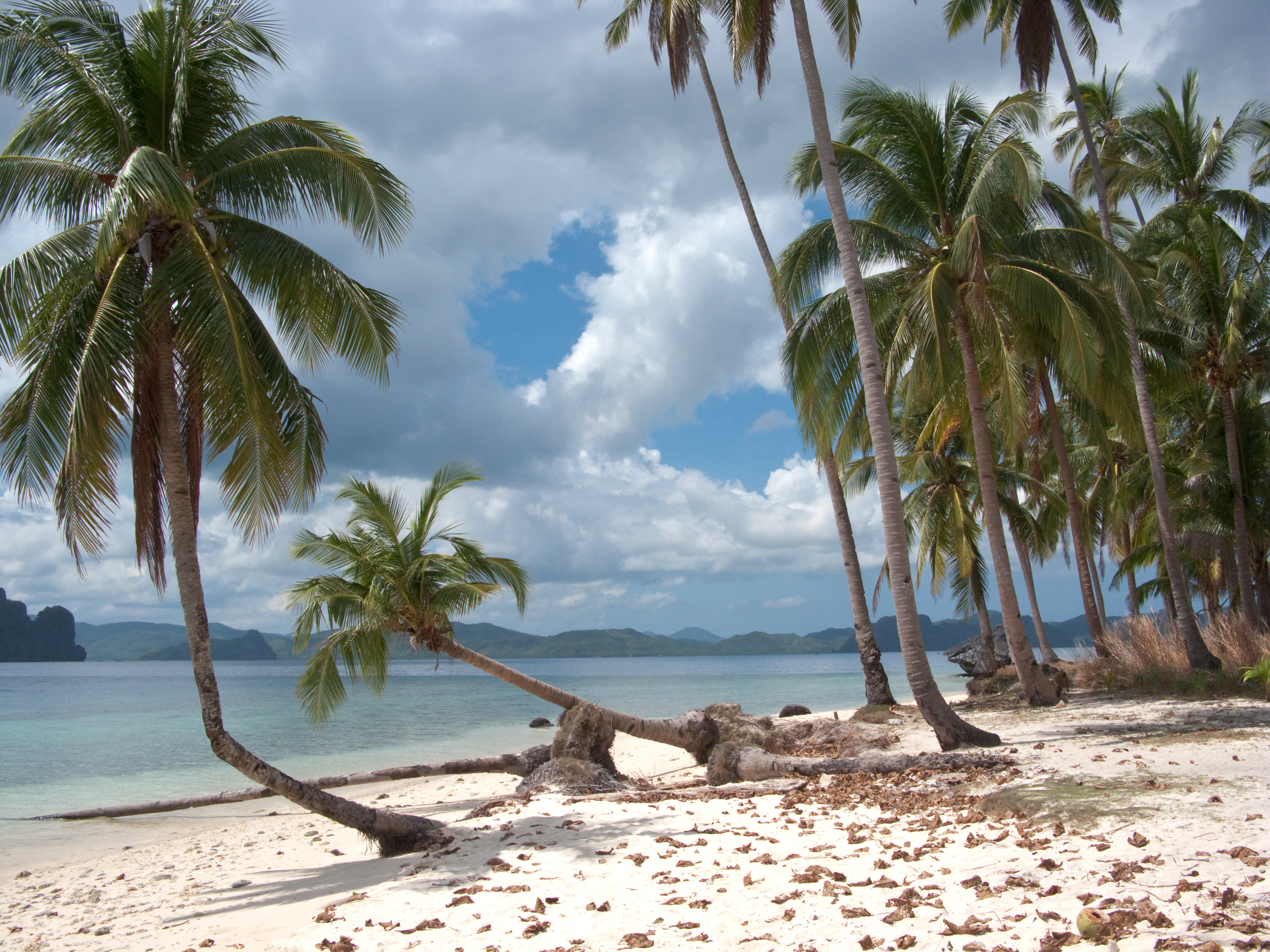
Corong Corong Beach

=== Establishment ===
In 1984, the then Ministry of Natural Resources issued Administrative Order No. 518, establishing a 360 square kilometres (140 sq mi) maritime area in El Nido as a turtle sanctuary. In 1991, the rest of Bacuit Bay, including its island and islets, was proclaimed by the Philippine government as a marine reserve. A year later, by Administrative Order No. 14 Series of 1992 of the Department of Environment and Natural Resources, this area was expanded even further. In 1998, its status was elevated to that of a protected area, including the terrestrial ecosystem of El Nido and portions of Taytay.

=== Extent and scope ===
The El Nido-Taytay Managed Resource Protected Area is the largest marine sanctuary in the Philippines. Its protected area status accords the areas of El Nido and portions of its neighboring town of Taytay a place among the eight priority sites in the country in need of conservation. The protected area covers a total of 903.21 square kilometers, of which 40% are terrestrial and 60% marine.

The provincial government has mobilized its citizens to participate in environmental conservation and protection programs, such as "Bantay Gubat" for forest protection and "Bantay Dagat" for marine life preservation. Patrolling within the protected areas, especially in the marine zones, is regularly conducted with the help of the World Wildlife Fund - Philippines that allocates funds to support said activity. The relevant municipal governments provide additional logistical support. The Palawan Council for Sustainable Management (PCSD) offers legal assistance during the litigation of cases filed by the Protected Area Office (PAO).

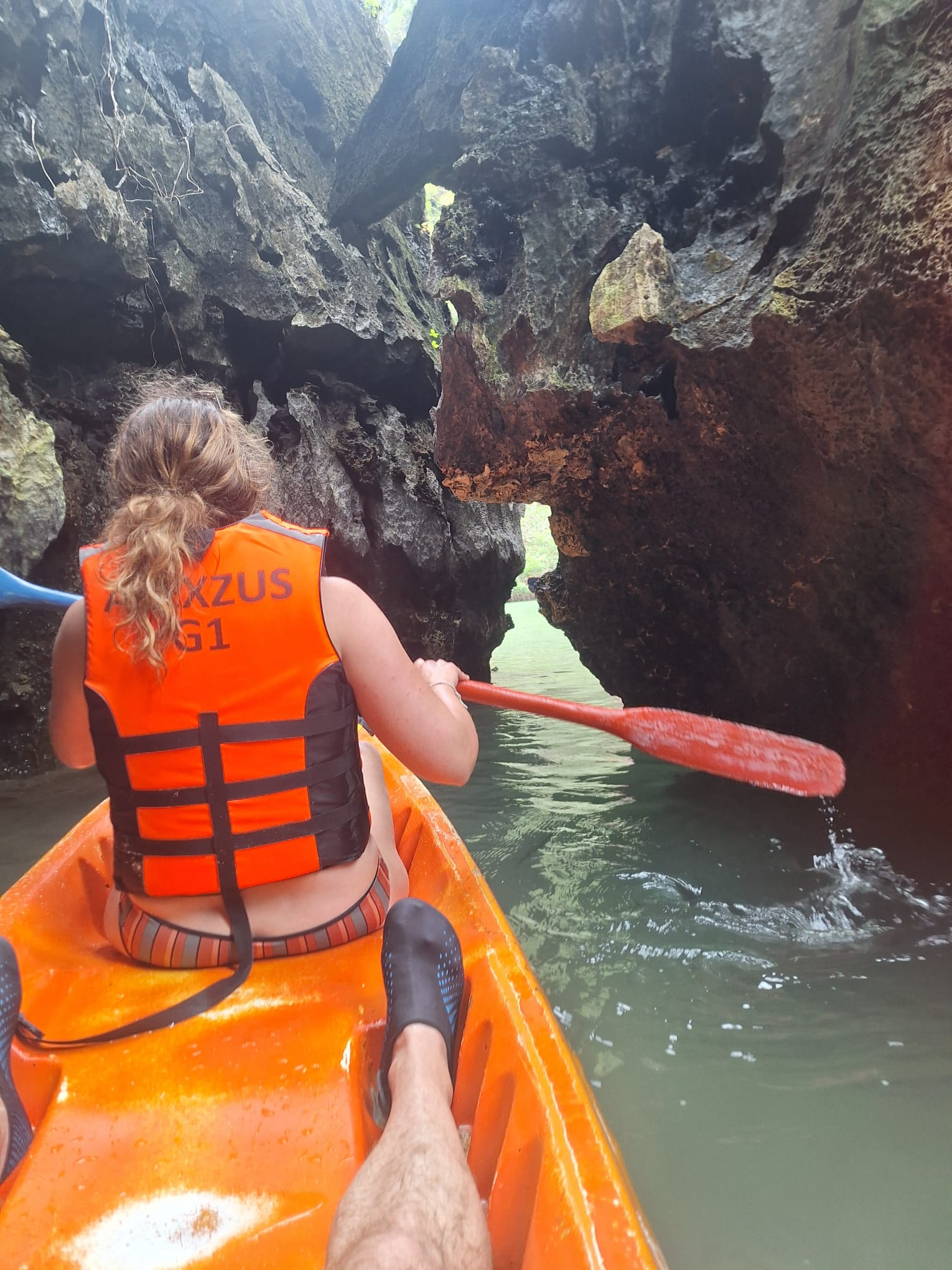
In a niche at the Big Lagoon El Nido

As a protected area, the Philippine government spends approximately US$ 180,000 annually to protect and manage its natural resources. Tourists are encouraged to pay US$ 0.50 per day as a conservation fee for the duration of their visit to the Municipal Tourism Office or the Office of the Protected Area Management Board (PAMB), which are housed in the Municipal Building in Calle Real. This was embodied in the PAMB Resolution No. 08 series 2000 from the National Integrated Protected Area Program (NIPAP) of the Department of Environment and Natural Resources (DENR).

El Nido, one of the country's most diverse ecosystems, is protected for its unique flora, fauna, and pristine geologic formations. These include:

- limestone cliffs, the home of the swiftlets
- 50 white sand beaches
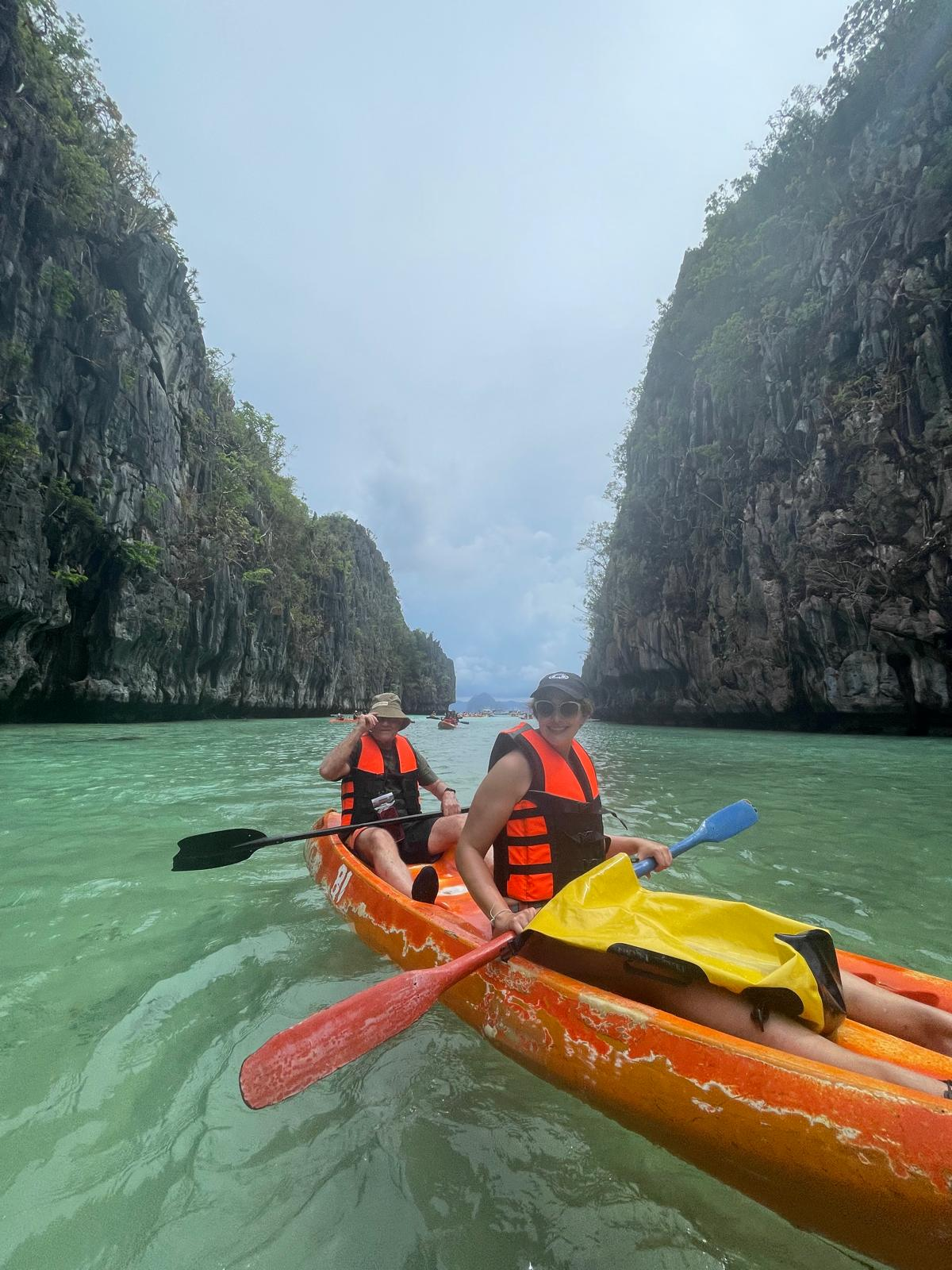
- Rowing at the Big Lagoon.
  5 types of forest (the lowland evergreen rainforests found in the mainland and islands such as Miniloc, Lagen, and Pangulasian; semi-deciduous forests; forests over limestone; beach forests; the mangrove forests found mostly around major rivers and creeks in the mainland)
- 3 major marine habitats
- 16 endemic and 10 threatened species of birds (including the Palawan hornbill, the Palawan shama, the Palawan tit, Palawan scops owl, and the Palawan peacock pheasant)
- 6 species of marine mammals endemic to Palawan (including dolphins and its native dugong)
- The Palawan tree shrew, the Palawan stink badger, the Palawan spiny rat, the Palawan anteater, and the northern Palawan tree squirrel
- 4 species of endangered marine turtles (hawksbill, olive ridley, leatherback and green sea turtles)
- 100 species of corals, 45 of which belong to the genera of hard corals
- 813 species of fish

== Transportation ==
=== Air ===
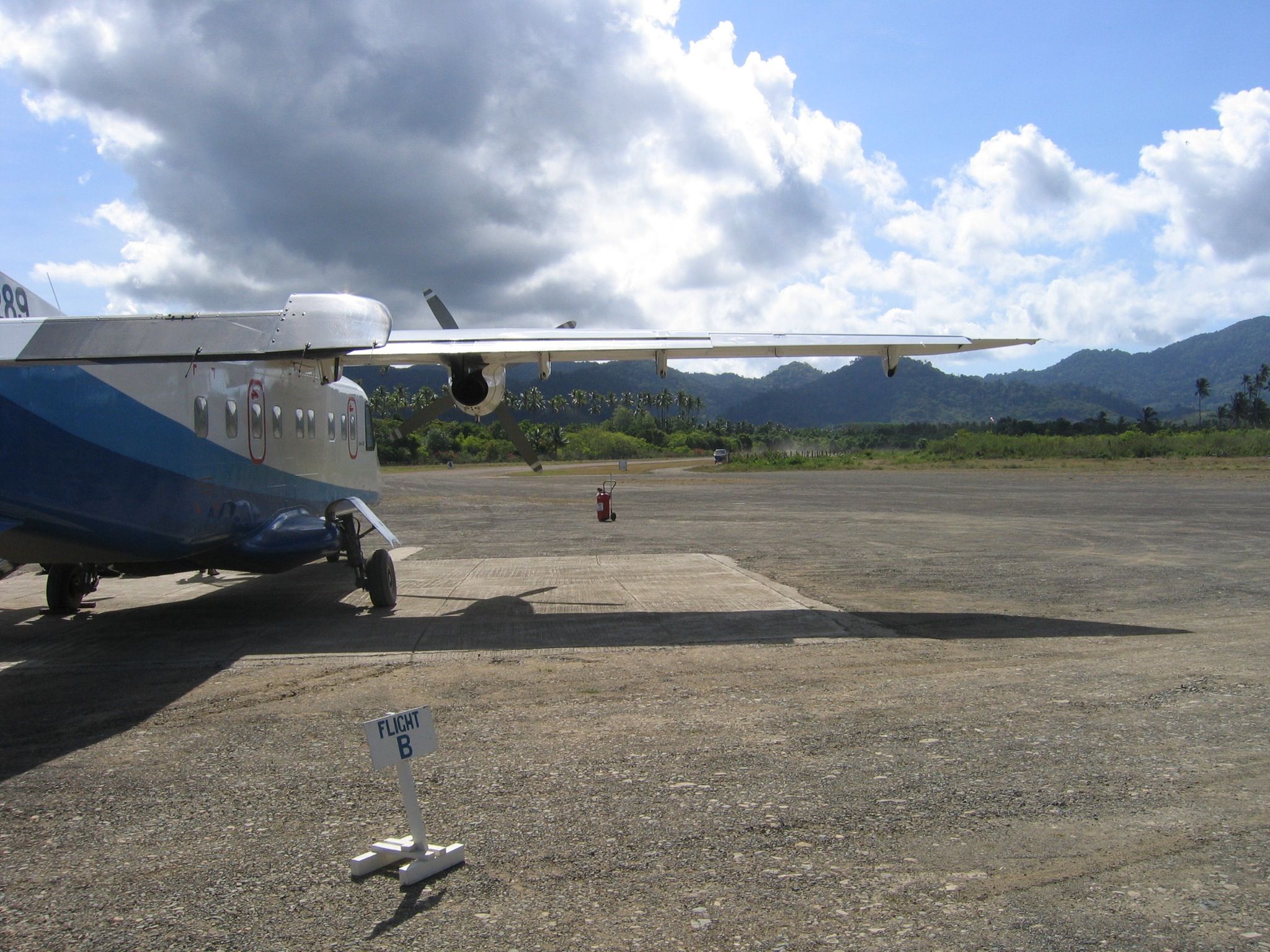
Island Transvoyager's Dornier 228 aircraft at Lio Airport

El Nido Airport, also known as Lio Airport, is the primary and sole airport serving the town of El Nido.

=== Roads ===
The main roads of El Nido are organized around a set of radial and circumferential roads that radiate and circle in and around the town proper and its rural barangays. Its interconnected roads link to the major highway leading to Puerto Princesa, Palawan's capital. Daily buses and jeepneys depart from the San Jose Terminal in Puerto Princesa for El Nido. Tricycles are used for short-distance trips around the town proper.

The 60 kilometres (37 mi) national road between Taytay and El Nido was rehabilitated, and this has helped boost tourism and business activity in the area.

=== Seaports and piers ===
The main port in El Nido, which is under the jurisdiction of the Philippine Ports Authority (PPA), is located in Buena Suerte (Zone II). However, several small and accessible wharves, such as the San Fernando pier, are being used in other rural barangays. Several ferries and other sea vessels owned by Atienza Shipping Lines and San Nicholas Shipping Lines have regular trips from Manila to El Nido.

== Utilities ==
The Población area is part of the service areas of the electric utility, Palawan Electric Cooperative (PALECO), a division of the National Power Corporation operating with 0.423 megawatts of electricity. Other barangays use solar panels and electric generators. The island resorts generate their own electricity. Water services are accessible in protected water tables and facilities. Ten percent of the population can avail of the 'Level II Water System', or communal faucet, by the municipal government, while the majority of them are still dependent on deep wells and natural springs. Internet services are available in a few establishments with wireless broadband access.

== Education ==
Two school district offices govern all educational institutions within the municipality. They oversee the management and operations of all private and public schools, from primary through secondary. These are the El Nido del Sur Schools District and the El Nido del Norte Schools District.

El Nido has more than 10 public elementary and secondary schools across most of its barangays. El Nido Central School and El Nido National High School, both located in Poblacion, have the most extensive facilities and the most significant number of students among these schools. Recently, the Palawan State University opened its El Nido campus in New Ibajay, offering extramural programs and studies. Some of the lower-grade schools are located in Calitang, such as Calitang Elementary School, Pasadeña Elementary School, Barutoan Elementary School, Bucana Elementary School, and Lamoro Elementary School.

=== Primary and elementary schools ===
- Aberawan Elementary School
- Bagong Bayan Elementary School
- Barotuan Elementary School
- Bebeladan Elementary School
- Bucana Elementary School
- Buluang Elementary School
- Cagbanaba ElementarySchool
- Calitang Elementary School
- Dagmay Elementary School
- Danat Elementary School
- Diapila Elementary School
- El Nido Central School
- Geronimo P. Hamora Elementary School
- Gospel Light Christian Academy - Palawan
- Kiminawit Elementary School
- Lamoro Elementary School
- Ligad Elementary School
- Mabini Elementary School
- Manlag Elementary School
- Maranlao Elementary School
- Mayaod Elementary School
- New Ibajay Elementary School
- Pasadeña Elementary School
- Potter's Place School
- San Fernando Elementary School
- Sibaltan Elementary School
- Teneguiban Elementary School
- Villa Libertad Elementary School
- Villa Paz Elementary School

=== Secondary schools ===
- Bagong Bayan National High School
- Barotuan National High School
- Bucana National High School
- Diapila National High School
- El Nido National High School
- Mabini National High School
- Manlag National High School
- New Ibajay National High School
- Pasadeña National High School
- San Fernando National High School
- Sibaltan National High School
- Teneguiban National High School
- Villa Paz National High School

== See also ==
- List of renamed cities and municipalities in the Philippines
