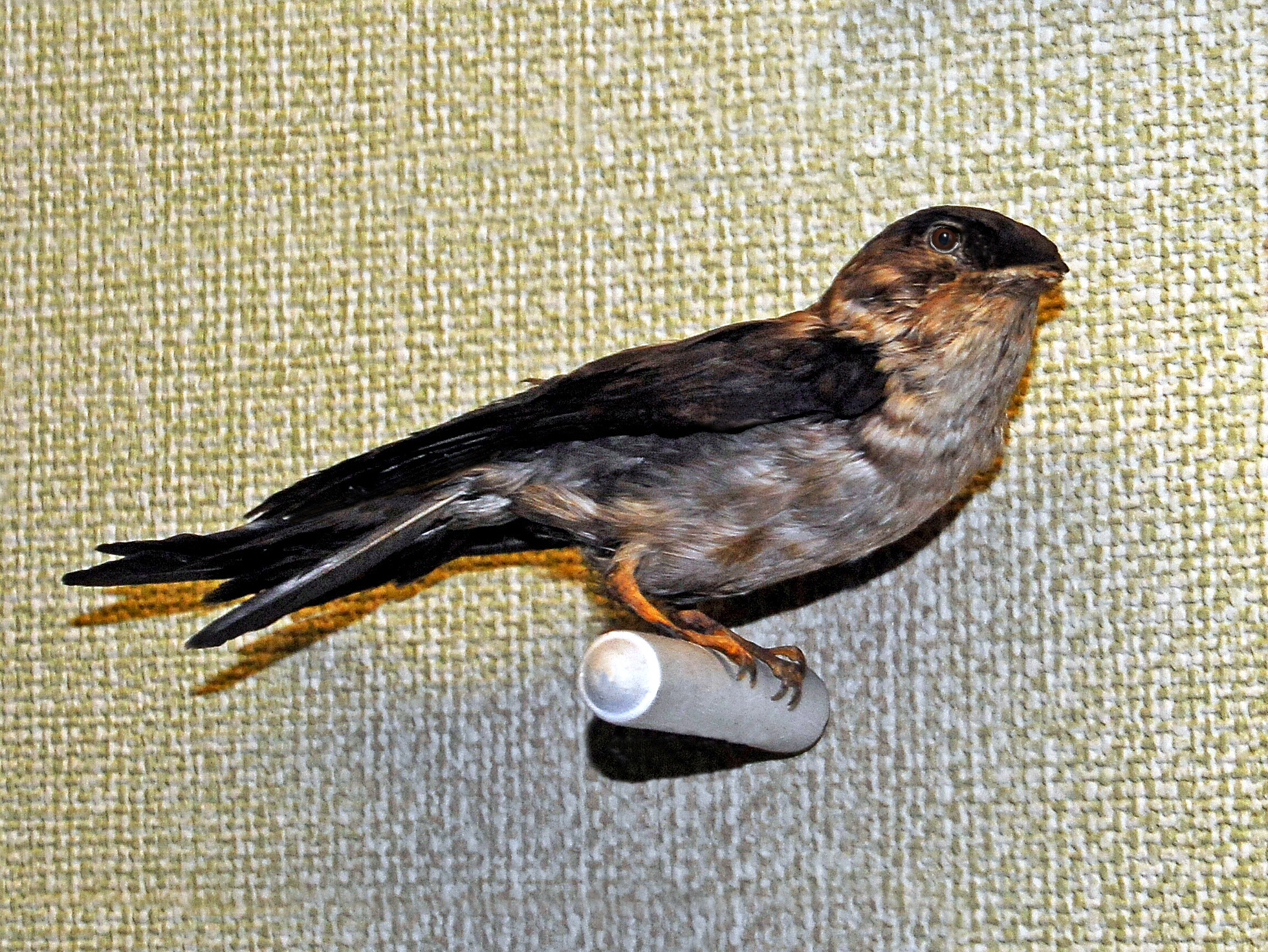
- Edible-nest swiftlet specimen in a museum

Conservation status
- Least Concern (IUCN 3.1)

Scientific classification
- Kingdom: Animalia
- Phylum: Chordata
- Class: Aves
- Order: Apodiformes
- Family: Apodidae
- Genus: Aerodramus
- Species: A. fuciphagus

Binomial name
- Aerodramus fuciphagus (Thunberg, 1812)
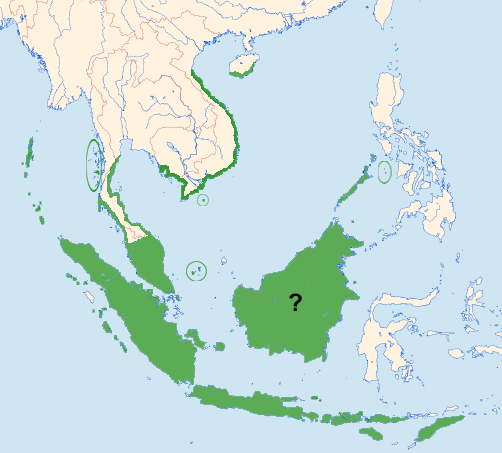
- Distribution

Synonyms
- Collocalia fuciphaga

= Edible-nest swiftlet =

Species of bird

The edible-nest swiftlet (Aerodramus fuciphagus), also known as the white-nest swiftlet, is a small bird of the swift family which is found in Southeast Asia. Its opaque and whitish nest is made exclusively of solidified saliva and is the main ingredient of bird's nest soup, a delicacy of Chinese cuisine. Germain's swiftlet (Aerodramus germani) is now treated as conspecific with this species.

== Taxonomy ==
The edible-nest swiftlet was formally described in 1812 by the Swedish naturalist Carl Peter Thunberg under the binomial name Hirundo fuciphaga based on a specimen collected on the island of Java. The specific epithet fuciphaga combines the Ancient Greek φυκος/phukos meaning "seaweed" with -φαγος/-phagos meaning "-eating". The edible-nest swiftlet is now one of 25 swiftlets placed in the genus Aerodramus that was introduced in 1906 by the American ornithologist Harry C. Oberholser.

Eight subspecies are recognised:

- A. f. inexpectatus (Hume, 1873) – Andaman and Nicobar Islands
- A. f. vestitus (Lesson, RP, 1843) – Malay Peninsula (?introduced), Sumatra, Belitung (east of south Sumatra) and Borneo
- A. f. perplexus (Riley, 1927) – Maratua (east of northeast Borneo)
- A. f. fuciphagus (Thunberg, 1812) – Java, Kangean Islands (north of Bali), Bali, Lombok to Sumbawa (west Lesser Sunda Islands, Flores Sea islands south of Sulawesi)
- A. f. dammermani (Rensch, 1931) – Flores to Alor Island (central Lesser Sunda Islands)
- A. f. micans (Stresemann, 1914) – Sumba, Savu and Timor (central south Lesser Sunda Islands)
- A. f. germani (Oustalet, 1876) – southeast Asia, north Borneo islets, Panay and Palawan group (central west, southwest Philippines)
- A. f. amechanus (Oberholser, 1912) – Anambas (east of southeast Malay Peninsula)

The last two subspecies in the above list (germani and amechanus) have sometimes been treated as a separate species, Germain's swiftlet (Aerodramus germani). The species are lumped together as the morphological differences are minor and clinal while the genetic differences are small.

== Description ==
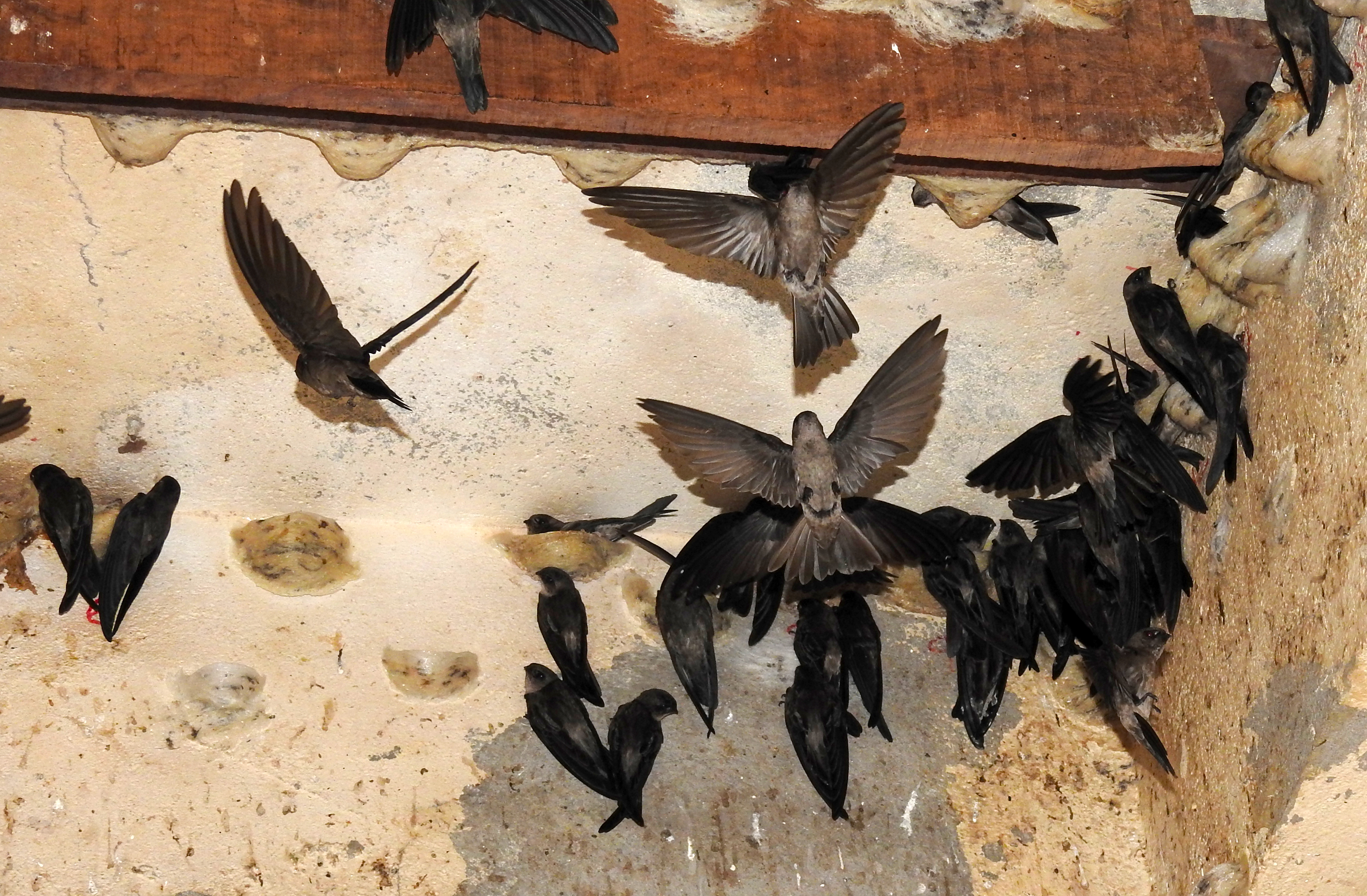
Swiftlets nesting in a building in the Andaman Islands

The edible-nest swiftlet, generally with a body length of 14 cm (5.5 in), is a medium-sized representative of the salanganes. The upper part of the slender body is blackish-brown; the under part of the body ranges in colour from white to blackish-brown. The tail is short and has a slight notch. The bill and feet are black. Legs are very short and tarsi are usually unfeathered or lightly feathered.

It weighs 15 to 18 g (0.53 to 0.63 oz) and the wings are long and narrow. In flight the swept-back wings resemble a crescent.

The subspecies micans is paler and greyer than the nominate while vestitus is dark with a rump that is less obviously paler. Subspecies germani has much paler underparts with a broad whitish rump, amechanus is similar to germani but has a greyer rump.

== Behavior ==
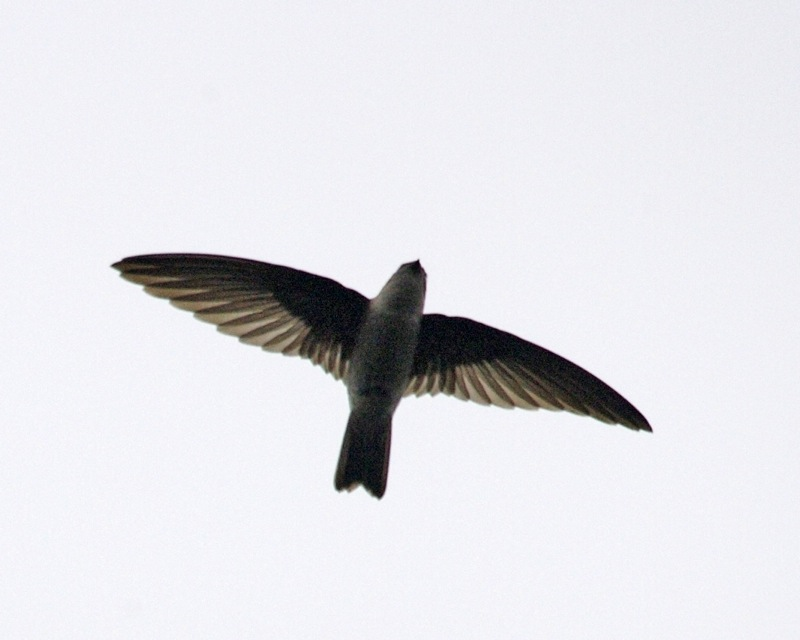
In flight

The edible-nest swiftlet feeds over a range of habitats from coastal areas to the mountains, occurring up to 2,800 metres above sea-level on Sumatra and Borneo. These birds generally occur above forests, the forest edge, but also in open country.

These birds spend most of their lives in the air. Their diet consists of flying insects that are caught on the wing. They also drink on the wing. They often feed in large flocks with other species of swiftlet and swallow.

They breed in colonies in coastal areas, in limestone caves, in rock crevices, in a cleft in a cliff or sometimes on a building. The bracket-shaped nest is built on a vertical surface and the long legs are used for clinging. These swifts never settle voluntarily on the ground. The nest is white and translucent and is made of layers of hardened saliva attached to the rock.

A nest typically measures about 6 cm across with a depth of 1.5 cm and a weight of about 14 grams. Two white, oval, non-glossy eggs are laid.

At breeding colonies, the birds emit high-pitched and burbling calls. They also emit a rattling call used for echolocation, which enables them to look for their nesting sites in the darkness of caves.

== Threats and conservation ==
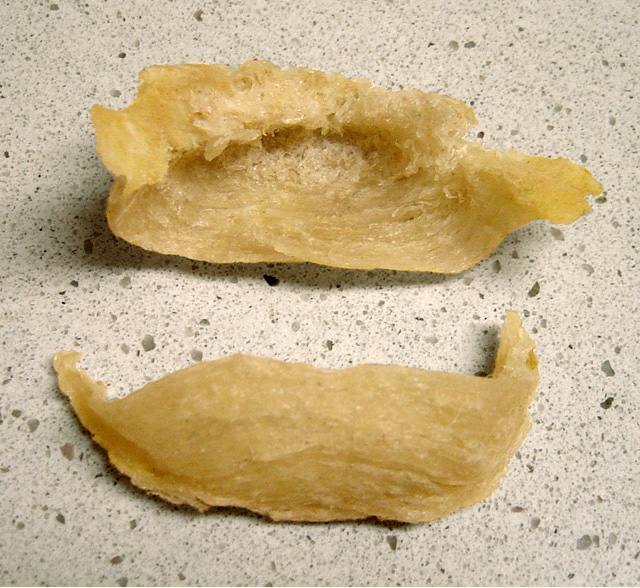
The nest before use in bird's nest soup

The nest used in bird's nest soup is composed entirely of saliva. The soup is made by soaking and steaming the nests in water. It is said to improve kidney health, reduce phlegm, and to be an aphrodisiac. The nests can fetch high prices and many colonies are harvested commercially.

Some populations such as those in the Andaman and Nicobar Islands have been harvested extensively leading to them being considered critically threatened under the IUCN criteria.

The use of artificial bird houses is growing. A detailed account of modern nest farming and marketing techniques is given by David Jordan (2004).

In Indonesia and Malaysia, "farming" of nests is performed in purpose-built structures or old empty houses with "tweeters" playing recordings of bird calls on the roof to attract swiftlets. In urban areas, such "bird houses" may be considered a nuisance by neighbours due to the loud bird calls and bird feces.
