= Edible bird's nest =

Bird nests made out of solidified swiftlet saliva, harvested for human consumption

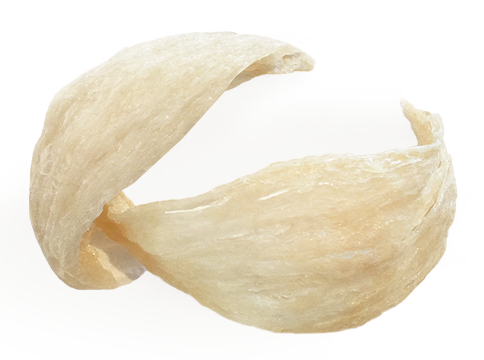
- Region or state: Southeast Asia and East Asia
- Associated cuisine: Singapore, Malaysia, Indonesia, China, Taiwan, Thailand, Cambodia, Vietnam, Myanmar

Edible bird's nest
- Traditional Chinese: 燕窩
- Simplified Chinese: 燕窝
- Literal meaning: "swallow nest"
Transcriptions
Standard Mandarin
- Hanyu Pinyin: yànwō
- Bopomofo: ㄧㄢˋ ㄨㄛ
- Wade–Giles: yen^{4}-wo^{1}
- IPA: [jɛ̂n.wó]
Yue: Cantonese
- Yale Romanization: yinwō
- Jyutping: jin3wo1
- Sidney Lau: yin3woh1
- IPA: [jin˧.wɔ˥]
Southern Min
- Hokkien POJ: iàn-o

Edible bird's nests, also known as swallow nests (Chinese: 燕窝; pinyin: yànwō), are bird nests created from solidified saliva by edible-nest swiftlets of various genera Aerodramus, Hydrochous, Schoutedenapus and Collocalia, which are harvested for human consumption.

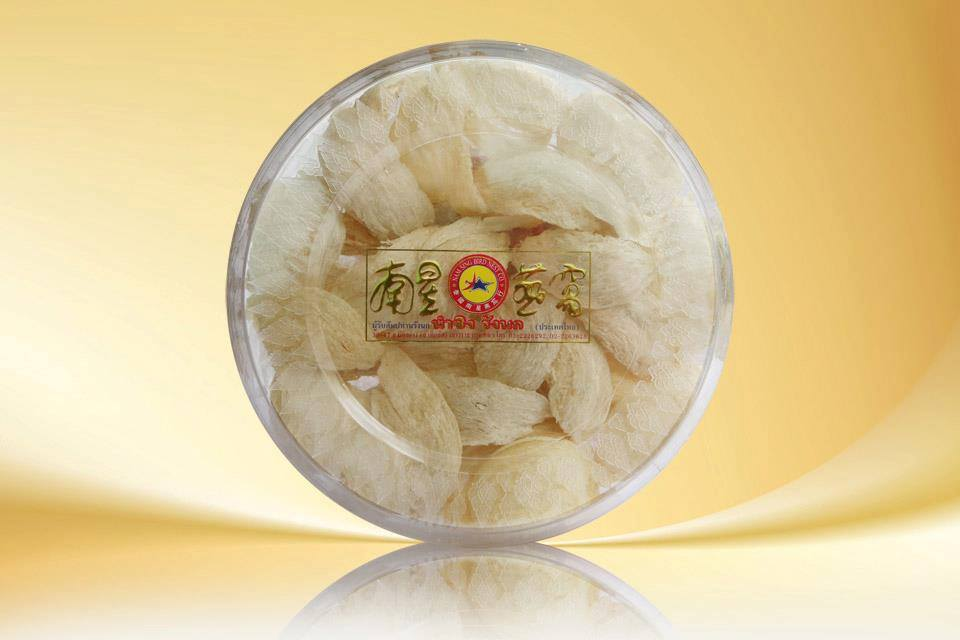
Edible swiftlet nests, packaged for sale

Swiftlet nests have been used as a delicacy for over 400 years, most often as soup. They are particularly prized in Chinese cuisine due to the rarity, high protein content and rich flavor, and are among the most expensive animal products consumed by humans, with prices up to about $4,300 per pound ($9,500/kg) depending on grading (based on shape, colour, and species). They are usually white, but there is also a red version that is sometimes called 'blood nest' (Chinese: 血燕; pinyin: Xuě Yàn).

== Etymology ==
The Chinese name for edible bird's nest, 燕窩 (yànwō), translates literally as 'swallow's (or swiftlet's) nest.'

In English, "swallow" refers to an ecologically-similar but unrelated group of songbirds (Hirundinidae) whose nests are not used in soup, whereas "swift(let)" refers to aerial insectivores in the order Apodiformes, which are more closely related to hummingbirds.

== Culinary use ==
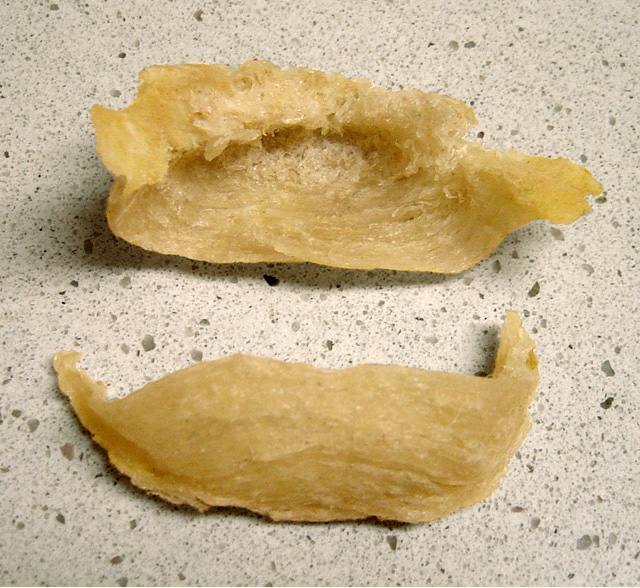
Dried swiftlet nests ready for cooking

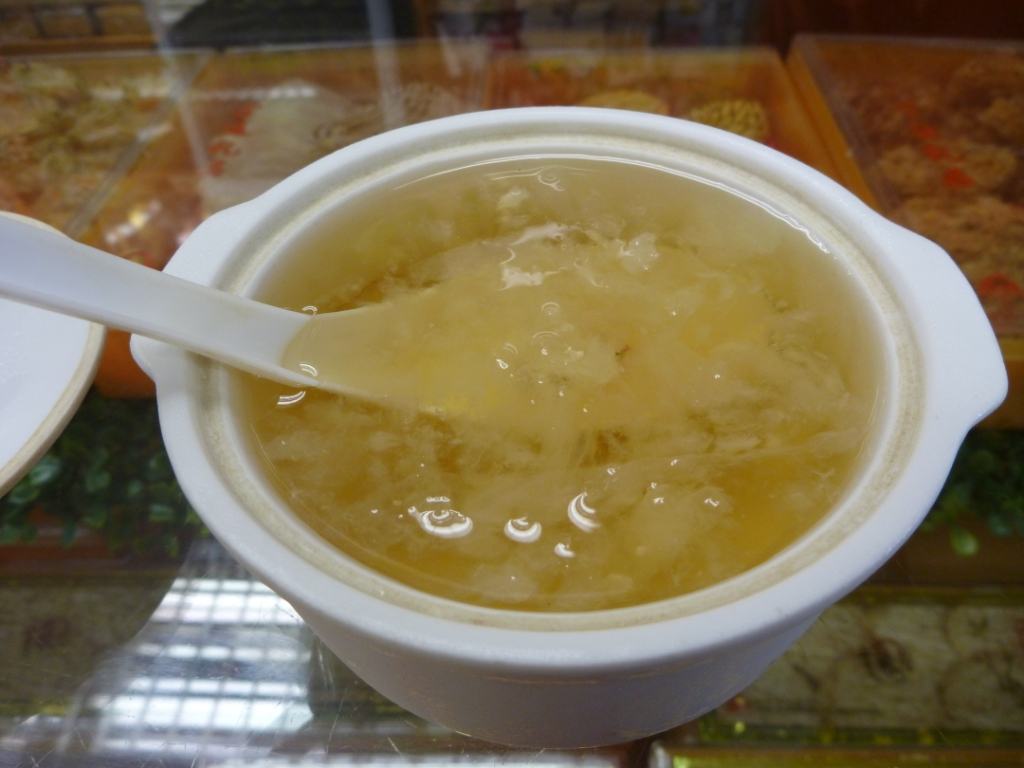
A bowl of bird's nest soup

The best-known use of edible bird's nest is bird's nest soup, a delicacy in Chinese cuisine. When dissolved in water, the bird's nests have a flavored gelatinous texture utilized in soup or sweet soup (tong sui). It is mostly referred to as 燕窩 (yànwō) unless references are made to the savory or sweet soup in Chinese cuisine.

Bird's nest was regarded by the ancient Chinese as a delicate ingredient not to be flavored or cooked with anything overpowering or oily. While it is rare and expensive, it must be served in relatively large quantities; otherwise its texture cannot be fully experienced and enjoyed. It is one of the most expensive animal products consumed by humans, with prices up to about $4,300 per pound ($9,500/kg) depending on grading. The type or grading of a swiftlet nest depends on the bird species, as well as the shape and colour of the bird's nest.

Besides soups, edible bird's nests can be cooked with rice to produce bird's nest congee or bird's nest boiled rice, and can be added to egg tarts or other desserts. A bird's nest jelly can be made by placing the bird's nest in a ceramic container with minimal water and sugar (or salt) before double steaming.

According to traditional Chinese medicine, it promotes good health, especially for the skin.

== Production and harvest ==
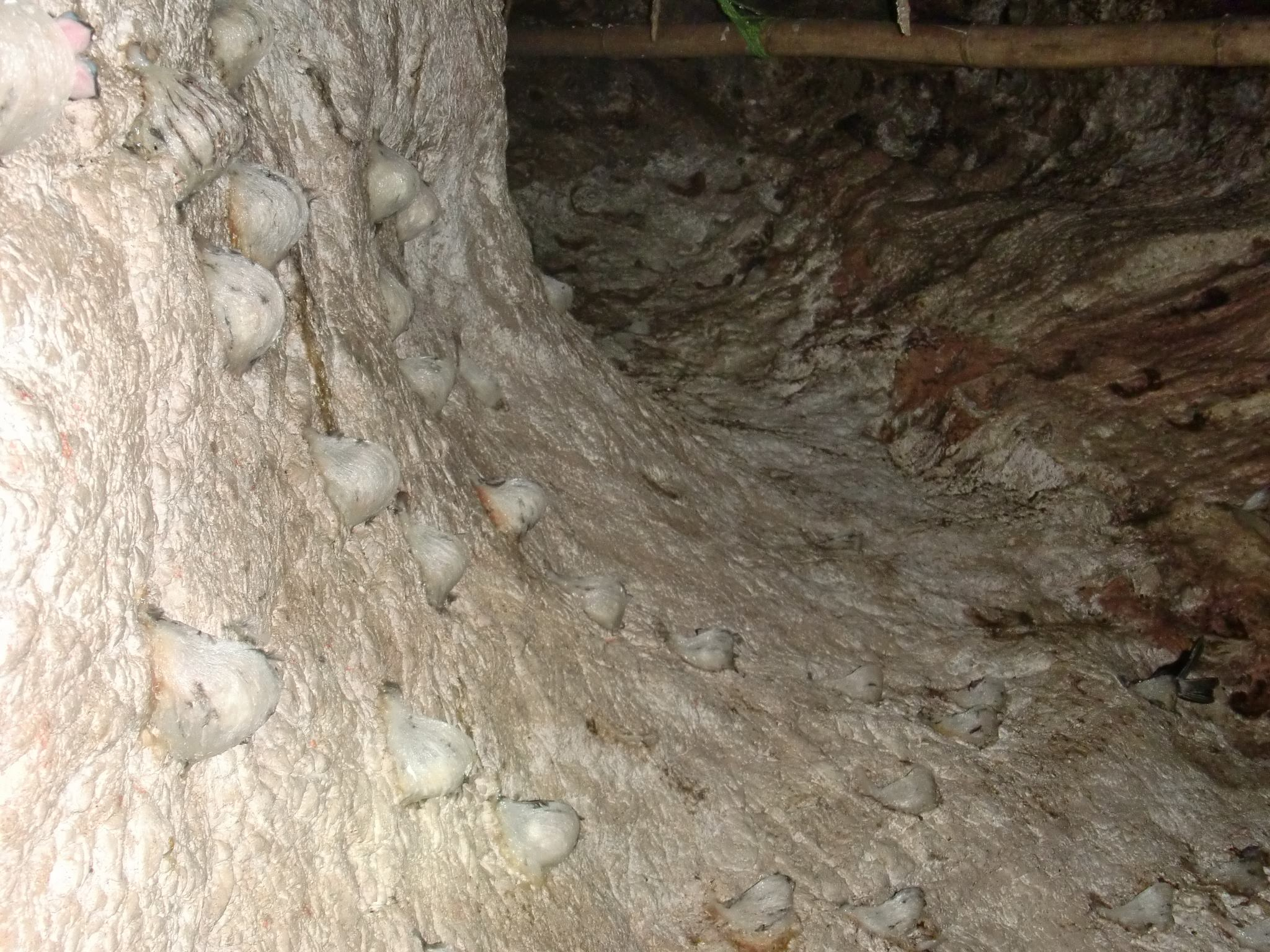
Natural birds' nests, Ko Rangnok ('Bird's Nest Island'), Thailand

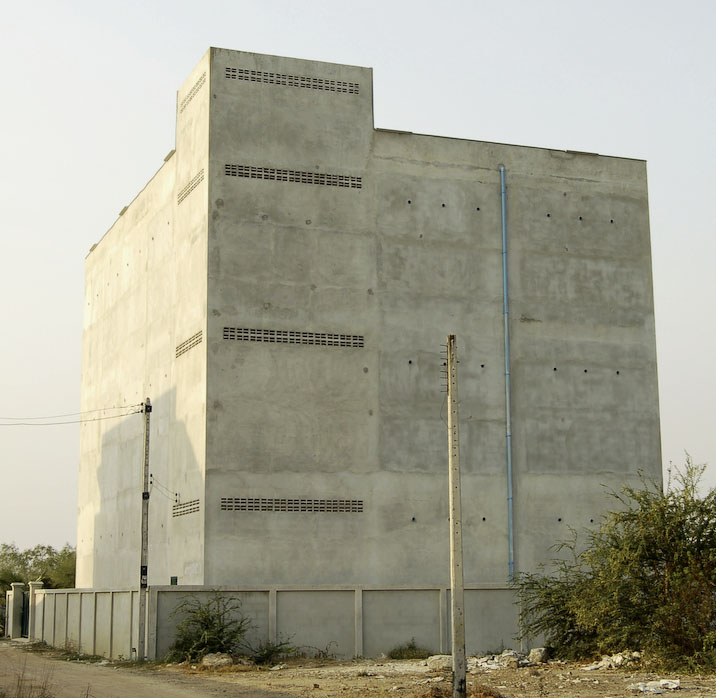
Nesting house for swiftlets, Ban Laem District, Phetchaburi Province, Thailand

The most heavily harvested nests are from the edible-nest swiftlet or white-nest swiftlet (Aerodramus fuciphagus) and the black-nest swiftlet (Aerodramus maximus). Previous studies conducted by Lee et al. have reported that the nutrient composition of edible bird's nest is dependent on the country of origin, food intake of the birds, climate and breeding sites. Most nests are built during the breeding season by the male swiftlet over a period of 35 days. They take the shape of a shallow cup stuck to the cave wall. The nests are composed of interwoven strands of salivary cement. The nests of both white-nest and black-nest swiftlets have high levels of calcium, iron, potassium, and magnesium.

The nests were formerly harvested from caves, principally the enormous limestone caves at Gomantong and Niah in Borneo. With the escalation in demand these sources have been supplanted since the late-1990s by purpose-built nesting houses, usually reinforced concrete structures following the design of the Southeast Asian shop-house (rumah toko/ruko).

These nesting houses are normally found in urban areas near the sea, since the birds have a propensity to flock in such places. It has become an expanding industry as is evident in such places as the province of North Sumatra or the Pak Phanang District in Thailand. From those places the nests are mostly exported to the markets in Hong Kong, which has become the center of the world trade in bird's nests; the industry is valued at around HK$4.3billion per year, although most of the final consumers are from mainland China. China is the world's largest consumer of birds' nests, accounting for more than 90 percent of consumption.

In some places, nest gatherers (known in the Philippines as busyadors) have seen a steep decline in the number of birds and a rise in unexplained fatalities.

== Nutrition ==
In one study, the edible bird's nest of A. fuchiphagus was found to be primarily composed of sialylated-mucin glycoprotein (containing approximately 60–65% protein, 30–35% carbohydrate, 1% fat), however, solubility and digestibility were low.

== Colour ==
Although bird's nest is usually white, there also exists a red version, called 'blood nest' (Chinese: 血燕; pinyin: xuě yàn), which is significantly more expensive and believed to have more medicinal value. In the market, a kilogram of white bird's nest can fetch up to US$2,800, and a kilogram of red nests up to US$14,000.

The reason for its characteristic redness has been a puzzle for centuries. Contrary to popular beliefs, red bird's nest does not contain hemoglobin, the protein responsible for the colour of human blood. Researchers reported in 2013 that 'bird soil' containing guano droppings from bird houses were able to turn white edible bird's nests red, and that edible bird's nests' colour is likely caused by environmental factors in cave interiors and bird houses.

Subsequently, a research team at Nanyang Technological University, Singapore has found that its redness is caused by the vapor of reactive nitrogen species in the atmosphere of the bird house or cave reacting with the mucin glycoprotein of the initially formed white bird nest. Red bird's nest contains tyrosine that has combined with reactive nitrogen species to form 3-nitrotyrosine. At high concentrations, 3-nitrotyrosine produces a distinctively rich red colour, while at lower concentrations, it produces the characteristic yellow, golden and orange colours seen in other varieties of bird's nest products.

The researchers also note that the bird nest also readily absorbs nitrite and nitrate from the process' vapor which explains why the red bird's nest contains a high concentration of nitrite and nitrate, which are known to lead to carcinogenic compounds. This may mean that non-white bird's nests are harmful to human health.

== Market ==
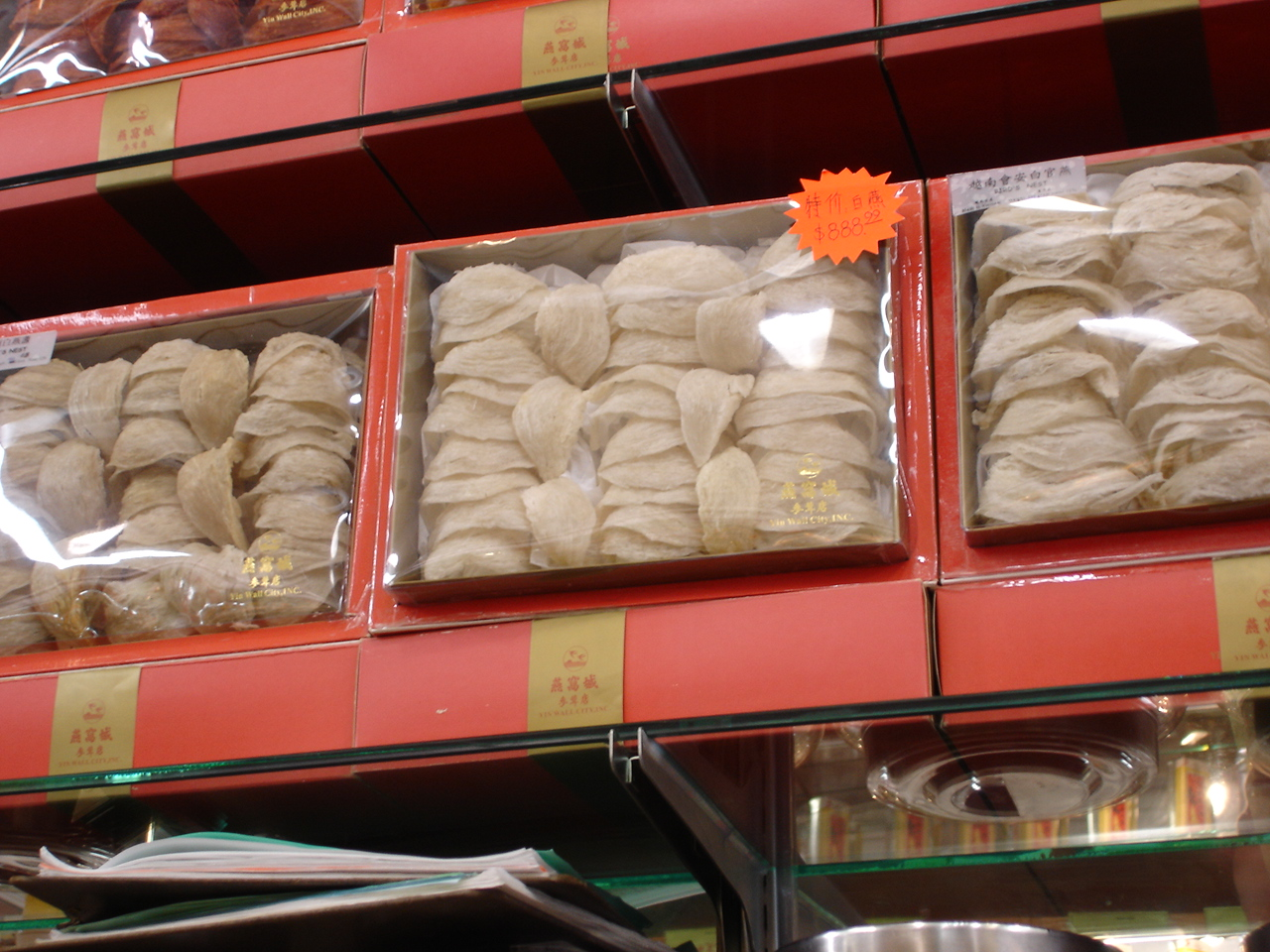
A box of bird's nests selling for US$888.99 in November 2006.

Indonesia is the largest bird's nest producer in Southeast Asia, exporting around 2,000 metric tons (2,000 long tons; 2,200 short tons) per year, followed by Malaysia at 600 metric tons (590 long tons; 660 short tons), and Thailand, 400 metric tons (390 long tons; 440 short tons). The Philippines, producing roughly 5 metric tons (4.9 long tons; 5.5 short tons) per year, is the smallest producer.

The bird's nest industry in 2014 accounts for 0.5 percent of the Indonesian GDP, a GDP percentage equivalent to about a quarter of the country's fishing industry. In Thailand, the trade value of bird's nests, both wild and "farmed", is estimated at around 20 billion baht per year. The industry globally is an estimated US$8.5 billion.

Hong Kong and the United States are the largest importers of nests. In Hong Kong, a bowl of bird's nest soup costs US$30 to US$100.

=== Counterfeiting ===
Besides the natural colouration process, the white nests can be treated with red pigment to defraud buyers, but methods have been developed to determine an adulterated nest. Natural red cave nests are often found in limestone caves in Pak Phayun District, Thailand.

The high returns and growing demand have attracted counterfeiters, leading to the halt of Malaysian nest exports to China. The Malaysian government has since employed RFID technology to thwart counterfeiting by micro-chipping nests with details about harvesting, packaging, and transport. Industrial quality-control techniques such as failure mode and effects analysis have been applied to bird's nest processing at nesting houses in Sarawak, Malaysia, and reported by a research team at Universiti Malaysia Sarawak.

=== Authentication ===
The high demand for edible bird's nest has attracted counterfeiters. Fake edible bird's nest or edible bird's nest with adulterants may be harmful to consumers. Hence, there is an urgent need to find a solution to the issues regarding the authenticity and quality of the edible bird's nest. Numerous sophisticated techniques have been used for the detection of adulterants in edible bird's nest such as energy disperse X-ray microanalysis, electronic microscopy and spectroscopy. Some other methods including DNA-based polymerase chain reactions, protein-based two-dimension gel electrophoresis and genetic identification based on mitochondrial DNA have found applications in the authentication of edible bird's nest.

Previous studies used gel electrophoresis in combination with liquid chromatographic methods to identify some common adulterants in edible bird's nest. In this study, gel electrophoresis and liquid chromatography were used for protein profiling and amino acids studies of cave and house nests, and others samples such as white fungus, fish swimming bladder, jelly and egg white. Each of the samples had a unique protein profile which will be reflected on the protein gel and these results were supported by the chromatographic analysis. Gel electrophoresis also was used to identify and differentiate the edible bird's nests based on their geographical origins.

=== Import restrictions ===
Because a bird's nest is an animal product, it is subject to strict import restrictions in some countries, particularly with regard to H5N1 avian flu.

In Canada, commercially prepared, canned, and sterile bird's nest preparations are generally acceptable, but may be subject to import restrictions.

== See also ==
- Traditional Chinese medicine
- List of Chinese soups
- List of delicacies
- List of soups
- Bird's nest pudding
- Seafood birdsnest

== Bibliography ==
- Jordan, David (2004). "Globalisation and Bird's Nest Soup". International Development Planning Review. 26 (1): 97–110. doi:10.3828/idpr.26.1.6. Archived from the original on 21 October 2008.
- Lau, Amy S. M.; Melville, David S. (April 1994). International Trade in Swiftlet Nests with Special Reference to Hong Kong. Traffic Network. ISBN 978-1-85850-030-0.
- Jong, Chian Haur; Tay, Kai Meng; Lim, Chee Peng (August 2013). "Application of the fuzzy Failure Mode and Effect Analysis methodology to edible bird nest processing" (PDF). Computers and Electronics in Agriculture. 96: 90–108. Bibcode:2013CEAgr..96...90J. doi:10.1016/j.compag.2013.04.015.
- Tay, Kai Meng; Jong, Chian Haur; Lim, Chee Peng (April 2015). "A clustering-based failure mode and effect analysis model and its application to the edible bird nest industry" (PDF). Neural Computing and Applications. 26 (3): 551–560. doi:10.1007/s00521-014-1647-4. S2CID 7821836.
- Lee, Ting Hun; Wong, Syieluing; Lee, Chia Hau; Azmi, Nurul Alia; Darshini, Murugiah; Kavita, Supparmaniam; Cheng, Kian Kai (2020). "Identification of Malaysia's Edible Bird's Nest Geographical Origin Using Gel Electrophoresis Analysis" (PDF). Chiang Mai University Journal of Natural Sciences. 19 (3). doi:10.12982/CMUJNS.2020.0025.
- Chang, Wui Lee; Tay, Kai Meng; Lim, Chee Peng (November 2015). "Clustering and visualization of failure modes using an evolving tree" (PDF). Expert Systems with Applications. 42 (20): 7235–7244. doi:10.1016/j.eswa.2015.04.036.
- Chai, Kok Chin; Jong, Chian Haur; Tay, Kai Meng; Lim, Chee Peng (August 2016). "A Perceptual Computing-based Method to Prioritize Failure Modes in Failure Mode and Effect Analysis and Its Application to Edible Bird Nest Farming" (PDF). Applied Soft Computing. 49: 734–747. doi:10.1016/j.asoc.2016.08.043.
- Hun, Lee Ting; Wani, Waseem A.; Poh, Heng Yong; Baig, Umair; Ti Tjih, Eddie Tan; Nashiruddin, Noor Idayu; Ling, Yong Ee; Aziz, Ramlan Abdul (2016). "Gel electrophoretic and liquid chromatographic methods for the identification and authentication of cave and house edible bird's nests from common adulterants". Analytical Methods. 8 (3): 526–536. doi:10.1039/C5AY02170G..
- Lee, Ting Hun; Wani, Waseem A.; Koay, Yin Shin; Kavita, Supparmaniam; Tan, Eddie Ti Tjih; Shreaz, Sheikh (2017). "Recent advances in the identification and authentication methods of edible bird's nest". Food Research International. 100 (Pt 1): 14–27. doi:10.1016/j.foodres.2017.07.036. PMID 28873672.
