= List of apple cultivars (L–Z) =

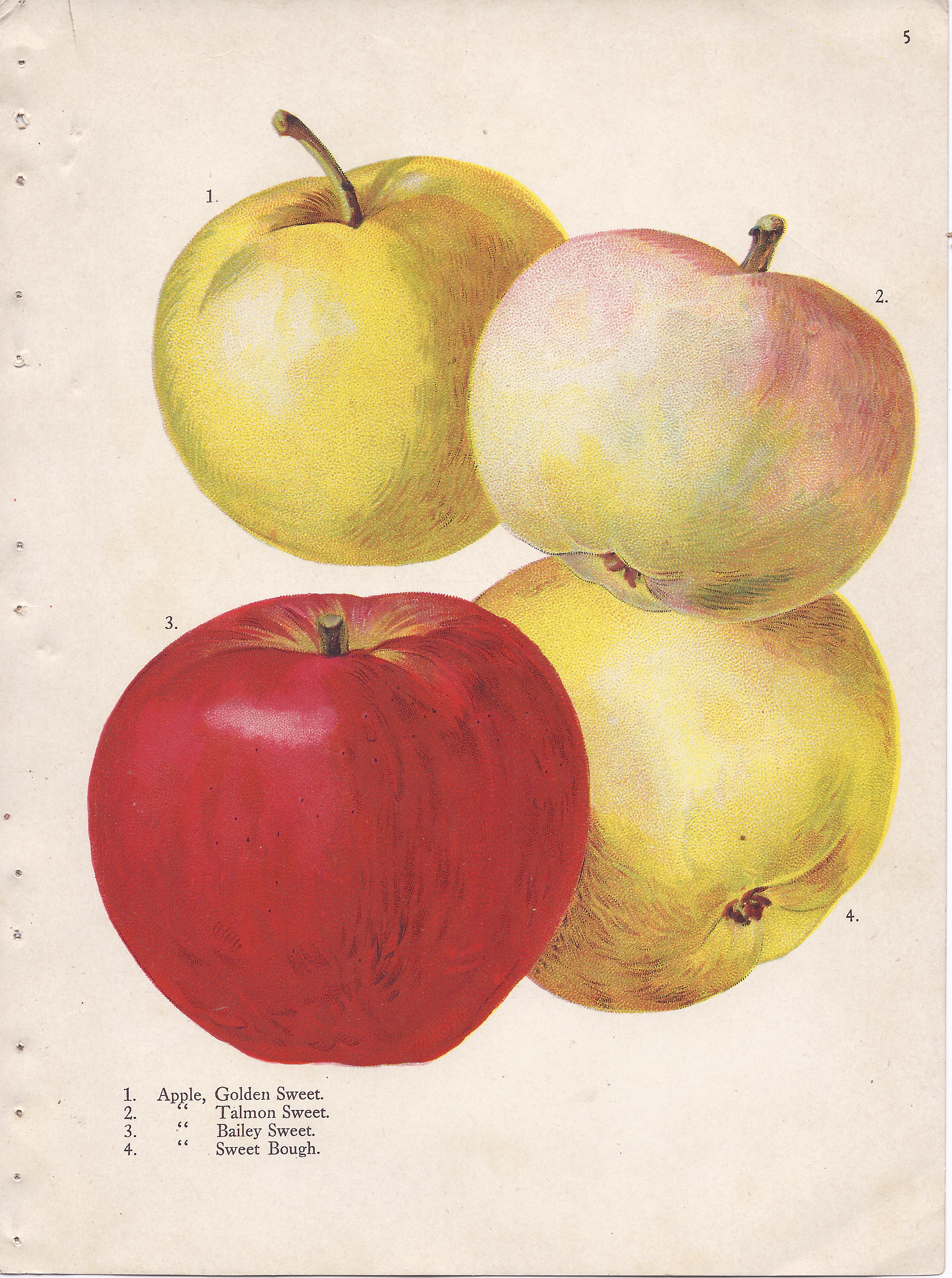
1909 illustrations by Alois Lunzer depicting apple cultivars Golden Sweet, Talmon Sweet, Bailey Sweet and Sweet Bough

Over 7,500 cultivars of the culinary or eating apple (Malus domestica) are known. Some are extremely important economically as commercial products, though the vast majority are not suitable for mass production. In the following list, use for "eating" means that the fruit is consumed raw, rather than cooked. Cultivars used primarily for making cider are indicated. Those varieties marked agm have gained the Royal Horticultural Society's Award of Garden Merit.

This list does not include the species and varieties of apples collectively known as crab apples, which are grown primarily for ornamental purposes, though they may be used to make jelly or compote. These are described under Malus.

== Table of apples ==
=== Abbreviations ===
Abbreviations	Full form	Abbreviations	Full form
AC	Apple canker	AM	Award of Merit
AS	Apple scab	AGM	RHS Award of Garden Merit
C, VitC	Vitamin C mg/100g	BB	Biennial bearing
FCC	First Class Certificat	DBH	Days from full bloom to harvest
PW	Powdery mildew	P	Parentage
RHS	Royal Horticultural Society	r	Resistant
PickG Pickg	Harvest time in Germany	Pick45	Harvest time at places with a mean annual temperature of 45 °F (7 °C)
PickE Picke	Harvest time in south England	Pick50	Harvest time at places with a mean annual temperature of 50 °F (10 °C)
s	Susceptible	Pick55	Harvest time at places with a mean annual temperature of 55 °F (13 °C)
TA	Titratable acidity %	SS	Soluble solids %
TRI	Triploid		
Languages
cs.	Czech (Čeština)	da.	Danish (Dansk)
de.	German (Deutsch)	fr.	French (Français)
hu.	Hungarian (Magyar)	nl.	Dutch (Nederland)
no.	Norwegian (Norsk)	pl.	Polish (Polski)
ru.	Russian (Русский; Russky)	sv.	Swedish (Svenska)

=== L ===
Common name	Image	Origin	First developed	Comment	Use	Pick/Use period
Lacker		Pennsylvania, US	<1800	Flesh white, juicy, subacid, aromatic.	Eating	Use January–March
Lady		France	<1800	A small apple. Width 46 mm (1.8 in), height 33 mm (1.3 in). Stalk 5–6 mm (0.20–0.24 in). Flesh white, firm, crisp, tender, juicy, aromatic, mild subacid, good to very good.	Eating	Use December–May
Lady Alice		Washington, US	1979	Medium-sized, roundish oblate with thin yellow-green skin with an orange blush and bright red stripes. Crisp yellowish-white flesh is sweet with hints of honey and almond. Don Emmons purchased a neglected orchard of Red Delicious near Gleed, Washington, in 1978. While cultivating between trees, a disc from the plow hit the base of a tree. The injury caused a new shoot to grow from the rootstock (likely a seedling grown from a pip). The shoot was allowed to grow and bear fruit which Emmons named for his mother, Alice.		
Lady Henniker		Thornham Hill, Suffolk, England	1840–1850	Large, oblong, ribbed. Flesh is sweet and spicy, firm, rather coarse textured. Width 73 mm (2.9 in), height 70 mm (2.8 in). Cells obovate, abaxile. TRI	Eating, cooking	PickE early October. Use November–January
Lady's Sweet (a.k.a. Pommeroy, Roa Yon)		US	<1860	Yellowish-green with red flush. Width 80 mm (3.1 in), height 70 mm (2.8 in). Stalk 14–20 mm (0.55–0.79 in). Flesh crisp, tender, juicy with a delicious perfumed flavor, very good to best.	Eating	Use December–May
Lady Sudely		Petworth, England	1849, introduced 1885	A golden yellow apple with 50–100% red flush. Width 67–74 mm (2.6–2.9 in), height 57–67 mm (2.2–2.6 in). Stalk 5–10 mm (0.20–0.39 in). Flesh creamy white, juicy and subacid.	Eating	PickE mid-August; Use August–September
Lady Williams		Australia	c1935	A green apple with red flush. Width 70–78 mm. Height 65–70 mm. Stalk short. Flesh: firm, crisp	Eating	Pick November. Use January - May.
Lagatorka		Montenegro		Yellow with red stripes (90%). Width 74 mm (2.9 in), height 60 mm (2.4 in), weight 149 g (5.3 oz). Stalk medium. Flesh very juicy, acid, good.	Eating	Pick early October; Use October–March
Lakeland		Minnesota, US	Introduced 1950	A red apple. P Malinda x Wealthy.	Eating	PickE early September. Use September–October.
Lamb Abbey Pearmain		Kent, England	1804	A small yellow apple streaked and striped with red. Width 57 mm, height 51 mm. Stalk 6–13 mm. Cells obovate, axile. Flesh: yellowish-white, firm, crisp, very juicy, subacid, rich vinous flavour.	Eating	Use January–April
Lancaster Greening (a.k.a. Lancaster Pippin)		Pennsylvania, US	<1870	A green apple with russet. Flesh yellow, juicy, pleasant, subacid.	Eating	Use December–May
Landsberger Reinette (a.k.a. Landsberger, cs. Landsberská reneta, fr. Reinette de Landsberg)		Gorzow Wielkopolski, Poland	1840	An excellent apple for eating or cooking. Width 79–87 mm (3.1–3.4 in), height 64–78 mm (2.5–3.1 in), weight 130 g (4.6 oz). Stalk 14–22 mm (0.55–0.87 in).Cold storage 0 °C 150 days. VitC 3–6. Density 0.75	Cooking, eating	PickE late September. Pickg September 20–October 15. Use October–January.
Lane's Prince Albertagm		Berkhampstead, Hertfordshire, England	1841, introduced 1857	Green with orange blush. Makes a good apple crumble for Christmas: peak ripening happens in winter. Width 65–97 mm (2.6–3.8 in), height 60–75 mm (2.4–3.0 in), weight 115–200 g (4.1–7.1 oz). Stalk 10–20 mm (0.39–0.79 in). Cells elliptical, abaxile. Resistant to scab, very prone to mildew, prone to canker. P Russet Nonpareil x Dumelow's Seedling. VitC 13.	Cooking	PickE early October; use December–March
Langeland		Denmark	<1800	Width 64 mm (2.5 in), height 80 mm (3.1 in). Prone to canker.	Eating	
Langley Pippin		Chelsea, Buckinghamshire, England		Medium, tall, conical, brightly striped red. Flesh yellowish, soft and well flavoured. P Cox Orange x Gladstone.	Eating	Use August
Lansingburgh		Possibly Ohio, US	<1810	Flesh firm, subacid.	Cooking, eating	Use November–May
Large Bough (see Sweet Bough)						
Late Strawberry (a.k.a. Autumn Strawberry)		Aurora, New York, US	<1848	Whitish with red flush. Width 73–79 mm (2.9–3.1 in), height 63–69 mm (2.5–2.7 in). Stalk 22–24 mm (0.87–0.94 in). Flesh, yellow, fine, crisp juicy, vinous, subacid, very good.	Eating	Use October–December
Lawver		Possibly Kansas, US	<1850	Width 61 mm (2.4 in), height 46 mm (1.8 in). Stalk 15 mm (0.59 in). Biennial. Flesh white, firm, crisp, aromatic, subacid. Stalk medium.	Eating	Use January–May
Laxton's Advance (see Advance)						
Laxton's Early Crimson		Bedfordshire, England	Raised 1908. Introduced 1931.	Width 51–67 mm (2.0–2.6 in), height 51–63 mm (2.0–2.5 in). Stalk 17–21 mm (0.67–0.83 in). A green apple flushed with brownish purple. Flesh very sweet, little acidity. P Worcester Pearmain x Gladstone.	Eating	PickE early August; use August
Laxton's Epicure agm		Bedfordshire, United Kingdom	1909	Aromatic sweet fruit, tendency to biennial habit, bruises easily. Width 58–63 mm (2.3–2.5 in), height 49–54 mm (1.9–2.1 in). Stalk 30–35 mm (1.2–1.4 in). Yellow flesh with streaks of red and orange.	Eating	Pick late August; use August–September
Laxton's Exquisite (see Exquisite)
Laxton's Favourite		Bedfordshire, England	Raised 1925, introduced 1951.	Sweet crisp, juicy flesh. A yellow apple totally flushed and streaked with orange red.	Eating	Pick late August; use September–October
Laxton's Fortune (see Fortune)						
Laxton's Herald		Bedfordshire, England	1906	Yellow skinned flushed almost completely with red stripes.	Eating	PickE late August; use September.
Laxton's Imperial		England	1907, introduced 1926 or 1928	Yellow with red flush. P Cox Orange x Allington.	Eating	
Laxton's Leader		Bedfordshire, England	1905	A small apple. Width 57 mm (2.2 in), height 46 mm (1.8 in). P Gladstone x Worcester Pearmain.	Eating	PickE early August; use August
Laxton's Pearmain		Bedfordshire, England	1897, introduced 1922	Cellini x Cox Orange Pippin. Width 67 mm (2.6 in), height 54 mm (2.1 in). AM from RHS in 1922. Raised by Laxton brothers.	Eating	PickE mid-October. Use October–January.
Laxton's Peerless		Bedfordshire, England	1900, introduced 1922	A large yellow skinned apple with scattered russet. AM from RHS in 1920. Width 86 mm (3.4 in), height 72 mm (2.8 in). Flesh crisp, acid. Prone to bitter pit.	Eating	PickE mid-September; use September–November
Laxton's Pioneer		Bedfordshire, England	1934	Large yellow apple almost completely covered with ared flush and stripes. Width 82 mm (3.2 in), height 67 mm (2.6 in).	Eating	Pick late September; use October–November
Laxton's Rearguard		Bedfordshire, England	Raised 1907	A greenish yellow apple with orange red blush. Width 53 mm. Height 43 mm. Stalk 20 mm. Flesh: greenish-white, firm, crisp, sweet-sharp, slightly aromatic, flavour.	Eating	PickE early October. Use November–January.
Laxton's Royalty		Bedfordshire, England	Raised 1908, introduced 1932.	Yellow with red flush. Width 63 mm (2.5 in), height 50 mm (2.0 in). Cox-like aroma. Flesh sweet and juicy. P Cox Orange x Court Pendu Plat.	Eating	PickE late October. Use January–March.
Laxton's Superb	Cross section of a Red Laxton's Superb apple.	Bedfordshire, England	Raised 1897, introduced 1922	P: Cellini x Cox's Orange Pippin. AM from RHS in 1919. FCC from RHS in 1921. Classic old Victorian British apple. Green with dull red flush. Firm texture, but not very good juice producer. Prone to scab. Biennial. Width 65 mm (2.6 in), height 55 mm (2.2 in), weight 105 g (3.7 oz). Stalk 10–30 mm (0.39–1.18 in). Cold storage 2 °C 150 days. VitC 5. Density 0.80	Eating	Pickg October 1–15. Use October–March
Laxton's Triumph		Bedfordshire, England	Raised 1902. Introduced 1930.	Yellow with red flush. Width 60 mm (2.4 in), height 48 mm (1.9 in). P King of the Pippins x Cox Orange. Flesh aromatic, sharp. Particularly attractive blossom.	Eating	PickE late October; use November–January
Laxton's Victory		Bedfordshire, England	1926	A yellow apple with brown flush. Width 64 mm (2.5 in), height 56 mm (2.2 in). Flesh sweet and aromatic.	Eating	PickE early September; use September–October
Lemoenappel		Lunteren, Netherlands	1885. Introduced 1899.	A yellow apple with orange flush. Width 88 mm (3.5 in), height 78 mm (3.1 in). Stalk 13 mm (0.51 in).		Use November–January
Lemon Pippin		England or France	<1744	A medium-sized apple. Flesh: firm, crisp, and briskly flavoured. A small tree.	Cooking, eating	PickE early October. Use October–December.
Lentsche Roode		Possibly the Netherlands		A yellow apple with red flush (60–90%). Width 67 mm (2.6 in), height 62 mm (2.4 in). Stalk 19 mm (0.75 in).		Use October–November.
Lewis Incomparable		England	<1800	Greenish yellow with 25–75% orange-red flush. Width 80 mm (3.1 in), height 73 mm (2.9 in). Stalk short. Cells obovate, axile. Flesh greenish-white, dry, subacid.	Cooking, eating, pie	Pick early October; use December–February
Liberty		New York	First fruited 1961, introduced 1978	A greenish-yellow apple, red striped. Very disease-resistant. P: PRI 54-12 x Macoun. Flesh nearly white, crisp, juicy, coarse. Very similar appearance to McIntosh, relatively short storage life in air. Ripens 4 days before Delicious.	Eating	Pick45 September 20. Pick 55 September 5. Use October–December.
Limbertwig		Virginia, US	<1800	Width 78 mm (3.1 in), height 65 mm (2.6 in). Stalk 8 mm (0.31 in). Flesh subacid, very juicy, rich, aromatic.	Cooking, eating.	PickE late October. Use March–April
Limelight		Kent, England	2000	Greensleeves type; abundant cropping and a compact tree. A pale green apple with a smooth finish and occasional pink blush. Crisp flesh and disease resistant tree.	Eating	
Limonen-Reinette		?	<1820	A yellow apple with red overcolor. Width 66 mm, height 55 mm. Stalk 15 mm. Flesh yellowish, juicy, subacid.	Eating	Pick October. Use January - June.
Linda		Ottawa, Ontario, Canada	Selected 1914. Introduced c. 1935	A large apple. Tree vigorous.	Eating	
Linsenhofener Renette (a.k.a. Linsenhofer Sämling)		Baden-Württemberg, Germany		A green apple with red flush. Flesh; yellowish, crisp, juicy, subacid.	Cooking, cider, juice.	PickG mid-October; use October–March.
Liveland Raspberry (a.k.a. Lowland Raspberry)		Livland Governorate	Before 1870 (documented)	A white apple with red flush. Flesh very tender, sweet.	Eating	Pick August
Ljutaĉa (a.k.a. Kiseljaĉa)		Montenegro		A green apple. Russet in stalk cavity. Width 69 mm (2.7 in), height 51 mm (2.0 in), weight 111 g (3.9 oz). Stalk medium. Flesh creamy green, juicy, subacid.	Eating, cooking	Pick late October; use December–June
Lobo		Ottawa, Canada	1897. Selected 1906. Introduced 1930	A McIntosh-style apple. P McIntosh x unknown. Yellow with red overclour. Width 73 mm (2.9 in), height 67 mm (2.6 in). Cold storage 4 °C 90 days.	Eating	PickE mid-September. PickG early–mid-September; use October–March
Loddington		Kent, England	c. 1820	FCC from RHS in 1877. Width 89 mm (3.5 in), height 79 mm (3.1 in). Stalk short. Flesh, soft, juicy, subacid.	Cooking	PickE late September; use October–December
Lodgemore Nonpareil (a.k.a. Clissold's Seedling)		Lodgemore, Gloucestershire, England	1808	A dessert apple of great excellence. Flesh crisp, greenish, sweet, juicy, very good.	Eating	PickE early October. Use February–May
Lodi		Ohio, US	1911, introduced 1924	Fruit pale yellow flushed with deeper yellow. P Montgomery x Yellow Transparent. Width 70 mm (2.8 in), height 70 mm (2.8 in). Resistant to scab. Tangy taste. DBH 80.	Eating	Pick45 August 1. Pick50 July 27. Pick55 July 10. Use July–August
Lombarts Calville (a.k.a. Lombarts Kalvill)		Netherlands	Raised 1906, introduced 1911.	Width 65–75 mm, height 55–65 mm. Cold storage 3 °C 150 days.	Eating	PickE mid-October. Use November - January.
London Pippin (cs. Londýnské, Londýnský jadernáč, pl. Pepina Londynska, ru. Kalvil korolevskii, Kalvil limonnîi, Peppin Londonskii)		England	1580	Yellow with red flush. Width 74–80 mm (2.9–3.1 in), height 53–59 mm (2.1–2.3 in). Stalk 15–18 mm (0.59–0.71 in). Cells round axile.VitC 8.	Cooking, eating, cider	PickE mid-October; use January–March
London Sweet		Dayton, Ohio, US	<1860	A yellow apple. Stalk short. Flesh whitish, juicy, tender, sweet, aromatic, good to very good. Tree vigorous, productive.	Eating	Use November–February
Longfield		Russia	<1870	Width 70–83 mm (2.8–3.3 in), height 67–75 mm (2.6–3.0 in). Stalk 14–22 mm (0.55–0.87 in). Flesh, greenish, crisp, tender, juicy, subacid, aromatic, good to very good.	Eating	Use September–October
Long Island Russet		Long Island, US	<1820	Flesh yellowish, dry, sweet.	Cider	Use October–February
Long Red Pearmain		US	<1860	A medium to large sized yellow apple flushed and striped with red. Flesh subacid, good.		
Longstart		England	1851	A very excellent culinary apple. Width 51 mm (2.0 in), height 44 mm (1.7 in). Stalk 25 mm (0.98 in).	Cooking	Use October–December
Lord Burghley		England	Raised 1834, Introduced 1865	Small yellow with brown crimson flush. Flesh soft, highly aromatic. Width 57–67 mm (2.2–2.6 in), height 44–61 mm (1.7–2.4 in). Stalk 15–20 mm (0.59–0.79 in). Cells round to obovate, axile. An excellent winter dessert apple. Tree small.	Eating	PickE mid-October; use January–April
Lord Derby		Stockport, Cheshire, England	1862	Yellowish green apple. Width 83 mm (3.3 in), height 70 mm (2.8 in). Stalk 5–6 mm (0.20–0.24 in). Strong ribbing. Cells ovate, abaxile. P Forester x Woodford. Flesh pale yellow, subacid. likes cooler weather. Subject to brown rot.	Cooking	PickE late September; use November–December
Lord Grosvenor		England	1872	Large conical, pale creamy yellow, cooks to a white froth. Enormous cropper, must be thinned. Width 74–88 mm (2.9–3.5 in), height 64–82 mm (2.5–3.2 in). Stalk 25–28 mm (0.98–1.10 in).	Cooking	PickE mid-August; use August–September
Lord Hindlip		Worcestershire, England	<1896	Late, high-quality dessert apple for use in December to March. Width 64–73 mm (2.5–2.9 in), height 73–77 mm (2.9–3.0 in). Stalk 15–20 mm (0.59–0.79 in). Flesh crisp, white, juicy, subacid. First Class Certificate from RHS in 1898.	Eating	PickE early–mid-October; use December–March
Lord Kitchener		England	<1900	A green apple with red flush, smaller than Peasgood Nonsuch. P Peasgood Nonsuch x unknown.	Eating, cooking, baking	
Lord Lambourne agm		England	Raised 1907, introduced 1923	James Grieve apple x Worcester Pearmain. Round shape. Orange flush with hint of russet. Width 64 mm (2.5 in), height 51 mm (2.0 in). Stalk 15–20 mm (0.59–0.79 in). Strong acid flavour. Good for domestic cultivation. Award of Merit from RHS in 1923. Cold storage 3 °C 150 days.	Eating	PickE mid–late September; use September–November
Lord Raglan		England		An excellent cooking apple. Yellow with red flush.	Cooking	Use March–April
Lord Suffield		Middleton, Lancashire, England	c. 1836	A very large grenn cooking apple no flush. Width 76–83 mm (3.0–3.3 in), height 75 mm (3.0 in). Stalk short–medium. Cells ovate, abaxile. This variety is often subject to canker and rotting on the tree.	Cooking	PickE mid-August; use August–September
Loudon Pippin		Virginia, US	<1870	A large oblate apple, yellow with red flush. Stalk short. Flesh yellowish, tender, juicy, subacid, good to very good.	Eating	Use December–February
Lowell		US	<1848	Width 83 mm (3.3 in), height 75 mm (3.0 in). Stalk 22 mm (0.87 in). Flesh greenish-yellow, juicy, subacid, aromatic, good to very good.	Eating, cooking, drying	Use August–September
Lowland Raspberry see Liveland Raspberry
Lucombe's Seedling		Exeter, England	1831	A culinary apple of first rate quality. Width 88 mm (3.5 in), height 69 mm (2.7 in). Stalk short and thick. Cells round axile. Flesh white, juicy, pleasantly flovoured.	Cooking	PickE mid-September. Use October–January
Luiken (a.k.a. Luikenapfel, Ludwig, Ludwigsapfel)		Germany or France	<1823	A yellow apple with red flush. Width 55 mm (2.2 in), height 48–50 mm (1.9–2.0 in). Stalk 12 mm (0.47 in). C 12. Flesh white, juicy.	Cooking	Pick September; use September–December.
Luisenapfel (a.k.a. Prinzessin Luise)		Canada	1860	Width 70 mm (2.8 in), height 66 mm (2.6 in), weight 110–200 g (3.9–7.1 oz). Stalk 15–22 mm (0.59–0.87 in).	Cooking, eating	Pick October; use October–January
Lujanca		Moldova		Yellow with purple to red stripes (90%). Flesh firm juicy, subacid. Biennial. Thinning is necessary. Width 62 mm (2.4 in), height 74 mm (2.9 in), weight 75–90 mm (3.0–3.5 in). Stalk 20 mm (0.79 in). Disease resistant.	Eating, cooking	Pick late September; use October–December
Lundbytorp		Denmark	c. 1900	A green apple with red overcolour. Width 74 mm (2.9 in), height 68 mm (2.7 in)	Eating	PickE mid-October. Use November–January.
Lunow		Germany	1920	Green apple with red flush. Width 70 mm (2.8 in), height 58 mm (2.3 in), weight 115 g (4.1 oz). Flesh; crisp, subacid to acid. Density 0.85. Biennal	Cooking	Picking October; use January–April
Lunterse Pippeling		Lunteren, Netherlands	Introduced c. 1900	A green apple with russet. Width 74 mm (2.9 in), height 58 mm (2.3 in). Stalk 37 mm (1.5 in).		Use January–March
Luxemburger Reinette (a.k.a. Reinette des Vergers)			<1850	A green apple with red flush. Width 71 mm (2.8 in), height 55 mm (2.2 in). Stalk 12 mm (0.47 in). TRI	Eating, cooking	Use February–July
Lynn		Washington, US	Selected 1999	A yellow apple with pink-red overcolor (20–80%). P unknown. Flesh: creamy-white, firm, crisp, juicy, subacid.	Eating	Pick 5 days after Delicious

=== M ===
Common name	Image	Origin	First developed	Comment	Use	Pick/Use period
Maayan		Israel	Introduced 1967	P (Calville St. Sauver x Damascus) x Delicious. Flesh juicy, sweet, acid.	Eating	
Mabbott's Pearmain		Maidstone, England	1883	Yellow with red flush. Width 56 mm (2.2 in), height 56 mm (2.2 in). Stalk very slender. Flesh juicy, sweet, highly flavoured.	Eating	Use October–December
MacExcel		Canada	Cross made 1971, selected 1992.	A greenish-yellow apple with pinkish red flush. Width 69 mm (2.7 in), height 56 mm (2.2 in). Weight 121 g (4.3 oz). Stalk short to medium. Flesh is creamy-white, firm, crisp, juicy. SS 12.4.	Eating	Pick 2 week before McIntosh.
Macfree		Trenton, Ontario, Canada	Cross made 1953, selected 1963, introduced 1974	A greenish-yellow apple with 75% red flush. Flesh is white, juicy, coarse, tough.	Eating	Pick55 September 12. Ripens second week of October in Trenton, Ontario.
Maclean's Favourite		Colchester, England	1820	A very excellent dessert apple. Width 62 mm (2.4 in), height 49 mm (1.9 in).		Pick early October; use October–January
Macoun		Geneva, New York	1909/1923	Cold-tolerant. Crunchy. P McIntosh x Jersey Black. Does very well in salads. Width 71 mm (2.8 in), height 61 mm (2.4 in), weight 100–160 g (3.5–5.6 oz). Stalk 10–15 mm (0.39–0.59 in). Cold storage 4 °C 120 days.	Eating	Pick50 September 30
Madresfield Court		England	<1915	AM from RHS in 1915. Tree is a shy cropper. Width 80 mm (3.1 in), height 81 mm (3.2 in). Stalk medium. Flesh is greenish-white, juicy, sweet, aromatic.	Eating	Pick late September; use October–December
Maglemer		Lolland, Denmark	<1810	Greenish-yellow with red stripes(25% overcolor). Width 55–62 mm (2.2–2.4 in), height 48–58 mm (1.9–2.3 in). Stalk 14 mm.	Eating	Pick late September; use November–January
Magog		Vermont US	<1876	Width 80 mm (3.1 in), height 75 mm (3.0 in). Stalk 19 mm (0.75 in). Flesh is firm, juicy, aromatic, subacid, good.	Eating	Use October–January
Maiden's Blush		Burlington, New Jersey, US	<1817	Width 86 mm (3.4 in), height 69 mm (2.7 in). Stalk 19 mm (0.75 in). A thin-skinned, flattened apple. Pale yellow-green skin has a telltale crimson blush on the side that faced the sun. Flesh is white, crisp, very juicy, subacid, good. Susceptible to scab. Heavy annual bearer. Good cooker. The fruit ripens over a period of several weeks, and reguires two or three pickings. Excellent variety for drying because the flesh remains white and bright. DBH 124.	Cooking, eating	Pick50 September 10. Use September–November.
Maidstone Favourite		Kent, England	<1913	Flat, even, most delightfully striped with carmine. P Alexander x Beauty of Bath. Flesh crisp, sweet and aromatic. Width 54 mm (2.1 in), height 48 mm (1.9 in). AM from RHS in 1913.	Eating	Use August - September.
Maigold		Wädenswil, Switzerland	Cross made 1944, introduced 1964.	Flesh is cream, crisp, juicy, aromatic, subacid. Cold storage 2 °C 150 days.	Eating	PickG mid–late October. Use February–April.
Maikki		Finland	Introduced 1980	A red apple. P Melba x Huvitus. Flesh white, sweet, subacid, aromatic.	Eating	Pick late August
Make		Finland	Introduced 1980	A yellow apple with red flush. Flesh juicy, sweet, subacid. P Atlas x Gul Höstkalville.	Eating	Pick mid-September
Malinda		Vermont, US	1860	Small, conical with sheep's nose; deep, rich yellow with red spots possible. Dry, dense, substantive flesh; mild, pear-like flavour. Tree good in climates with heavy snowfall.	Cooking, eating	
Holovousy Raspberry (cs. Malinové holovouské, Holovouský malináč)		Czech Republic	unknown	Red apple with rapsberry flavour.	Eating	
Malling Jupiter (see Jupiter)
Malling Kent		Kent, England	Raised 1949, introduced 1974	Parentage Cox's Orange x Jonathan. Width 64–67 mm (2.5–2.6 in), height 58–67 mm (2.3–2.6 in). Good keeping properties. Flesh is crisp, subacid, aromatic. Particularly attractive blossom. Cold storage 3 °C 150 days.	Eating	PickG late October
Malmbergs Gylling		Sweden	<1900	Width 75 mm (3.0 in), height 58 mm (2.3 in). Stalk short to medium. Flesh juicy, subacid, fair to good.	Cooking	Pick September; use October–November
Mangum		Southern US	<1850	Flesh yellow, tender, juicy, subacid.	Eating	Use October–November
Manitoba		Manitoba, Canada	Selected 1925. Introduced 1931	A yellow apple. P Duchess of Oldenburg x unknown. Flesh is white, crisp, juicy, sicy flavor, subacid.	Eating	Use November–February
Manitoba Spy		Manitoba, Canada	Selected 1927. Introduced 1931	Large red. P Patten Greening x unknown. Flesh is tender, juicy.	Cooking	Use November–February
Manks Codlin		Isle of Man	1815 (first fruited)	Pale yellow medium-sized fruit with occasional flush of red (0–20%). Width 55–72 mm (2.2–2.8 in), height 50–72 mm (2.0–2.8 in). Stalk 10–15 mm (0.39–0.59 in). Cells obovate abaxile. Hardy. Heavy producing.	Cooking	Use September–December
Mann		New York, US	<1872	Width 84 mm (3.3 in), height 65 mm (2.6 in). Stalk 19 mm (0.75 in). Biennial. Flesh yellowish, juicy, crisp, subacid, fair to good.	Eating	Use December–April
Mannington's Pearmain		Sussex, England	1770	Flesh yellow soft juicy. Old dessert apple, of no great merit. Width 67–69 mm (2.6–2.7 in), height 58–66 mm (2.3–2.6 in). Stem long. Cells obovate, axile, open.	Eating, cooking	Pick early October; use November–March
Mantet		Manitoba, Canada	Selected 1928. Introduced 1929	Yellow apple with orange overcolour. P Tetofsky x unknown. Width 75 mm (3.0 in), height 75 mm (3.0 in). Does not do well in warm climates. Cold storage 4 °C 40 days.	Eating	Pick July 20–August 15. Use August
Margaret (a.k.a. Early Red Juneating)		England	<1800	A red apple with streaks on the sunny side. Width 64 mm, height 58 mm. Flesh geenisk white, brisk, juicy. Cells roundish, ovate or obovate, axile, closed. Tree small.	Eating	Pick early August.
Margaret Pratt		Ontario, Canada	Discovered <1923. Introduced 1938	Nearly resembles Red Astrakan. P unknown.	Cooking	
Margil (a.k.a. Fail-me-never, Never-fail, Small Ribston, de. Muskat-Reinette, Muskaten-Reinette, fr. Reinette Musquée)		England	<1750	Highly flavoured apple held in very high esteem by connoisseurs. Width 54–66 mm (2.1–2.6 in), height 51–60 mm (2.0–2.4 in). Stalk 13–18 mm (0.51–0.71 in). Cells roundish ovate, axile. Slightly conical in shape, dull green skin with an orange-red blush, some russeting. The yellow flesh is firm, crisp, sugary, and as pomologist Robert Hogg said, "with a powerful and delicious aromatic flavour." The very small tree is weak and slender and bears light crops. Because it flowers early, it is susceptible to frost damage. It keeps well. Introduced to Brompton Park Nursery from Versailles by Henry Wise in the early 18th century.	Eating	PickE early October; use October–January
Mariposa		Sint-Truiden, Belgium	2013	Parentage Nicogreen x Nicoter	Eating	Pick mid to late September
Martin 1 (a.k.a. McLellan)		Connecticut, US	<1870	Yellow with red flush. Width 73 mm (2.9 in), height 56 mm (2.2 in). Stalk 6–16 mm (0.24–0.63 in). Biennial. Flesh is white, juicy, vinous, sweet, very good.	Eating	Use December–March
Martin 2		Louisiana	Discovered 1936. Introduced 1943	Yellow with red flush. P unknown	Eating	
Martini		Germany	1875	Flesh yellowish-white, crisp, juicy, subacid. Cold storage 1 °C 150 days.	Eating	PickG late October. Use December - March.
Mattamusket		North Carolina, US	<1870	Flesh is whitish yellow, crisp, subacid, good. Tree vigorous, productive.	Eating	Use December–March
Maunzenapfel		Württemberg, Germany	c. 1900	A small apple. Flesh is yellow to white, crisp, juicy, acid. Tree is vigorous.	Cider, juice	PickG mid-October. Use November–March.
Mauss Reinette (a.k.a. Love Beauty, Reinette de Multhaupt, Svanetorpsäpple)		Germany	<1874	A yellow apple with red flush. Width 62 mm (2.4 in), height 52 mm (2.0 in). Flesh juicy, subacid.	Eating	Pick October; use November–December
May Queen		Worcester, England	1888	Large, oblate, often russetted yellow apple with bright red blush and stripes. Crisp, greenish-yellow flesh, rich, nutty flavour. Similar texture to Ribston Pippin, and in a good year, its equal in flavour. In bad years it can be rather dry and harsh. Excellent keeper. Heavy annual bearer. AGM from RHS in 1892. Width 62–78 mm (2.4–3.1 in), height 51–65 mm (2.0–2.6 in). Stalk 14 mm (0.55 in).	Eating	PickE early October. Use November–May
McAfee (a.k.a. McAfee Nonsuch, McAfee Red)		Kentucky, US	<1870	Once thought to be lost forever, rediscovered in 2018 in Idaho. Flesh is whitish, crisp, subacid, good to very good. Stalk short. Tree very prolific and will produce huge crops of apples when mature.	Eating	Use December–March
McIntosh		Ontario, Canada	Discovered 1796, introduced 1870.	A popular, cold-tolerant eating apple in North America. Width 73–88 mm (2.9–3.5 in), height 63–67 mm (2.5–2.6 in). Stalk 15 mm (0.59 in). Flesh white, very tender, juicy, subacid, aromatic, very good. Cold storage 3 °C 90 days. DBH 120–132. Density 0.77	Cooking (applesauce), eating, pies	Pick45 September 1. Pick55 August 20. Pickg September 15–30. Use October–December
McIntosh Rogers (a.k.a. Red McIntosh)		New York, US	1930. Introduced 1932	A red mutant of McIntosh. Width 70 mm (2.8 in), height 67 mm (2.6 in). Stalk 10–20 mm (0.39–0.79 in). Cold storage 3-4 °C 100 days.	Cooking, eating	Pick mid-September; use October–December
McIntosh Wijcik (see Wijcik McIntosh)
McLellan (see Martin 1)
Mc Mahon		Wisconsin, US	c. 1860	Width 94 mm (3.7 in), height 76 mm (3.0 in). Stalk 29 mm (1.1 in). Flesh is white, tender, juicy, subacid, fair to good.	Eating	Use October–January
McShay		Indiana, US	Cross made 1962, first fruited 1970.	A green apple with red flush (70%). Width 64–67 mm (2.5–2.6 in), height 64–67 mm (2.5–2.6 in). Stalk 20 mm (0.79 in). Flesh is light green, firm, juicy, subacid, very good. Tree is vigorous.	Eating	Pick 2 week before Jonathan. Use October–November.
Mecklemburger Königsapfel (a.k.a. Roter Brasil)		Germany	1773	Width 65 mm (2.6 in), height 60 mm (2.4 in).	Cooking, eating	Pick October; use December–March
Medina		Geneva, New York	Introduced 1922	P Deacon Jones x Delicious.	Eating	
Mela Carlo (a.k.a. Mela Carla, Male Carle)		Italy	<1817	A dessert apple of the most exquisite flavour. Width 68 mm (2.7 in), height 68 mm (2.7 in). Flesh is as melting as that of the Doyenné pear.	Eating	Pick October; use December–March
Melba		Ottawa, Canada	Raised 1898, Introduced 1909	Green apple with red overcolour. Width 63–73 mm (2.5–2.9 in), height 61 mm (2.4 in). Stalk 17 mm (0.67 in). Cold storage 3-4 °C 90 days. DBH 94.	Eating	Pick50 August 7. PickE early–mid-August. Use August.
Melon American		Connecticut	1800, introduced 1845.	A first rate dessert apple. Width 68–86 mm (2.7–3.4 in), height 61–70 mm (2.4–2.8 in). Stalk 18–39 mm (0.71–1.54 in). Flesh yellowish, firm, fine, crisp, tender, juicy subacid and aromatic. The tree is a good grower, vigorous, very hardy.	Eating	Use December
Melonenapfel (cs. Řehtáč soudkovitý, de. Flaschapfel, Nonnetitte, Prinzenapfel, fr. Pomme de Prince, ru. Print.)		Germany	<1788	An oblong apple. Flesh is yellowish-white, subacid with a pleasant aroma. Width 65–70 mm (2.6–2.8 in), height 70–80 mm (2.8–3.1 in). Stalk 12–25 mm (0.47–0.98 in). Weight 125 gram.	Eating	PickG mid-September. Use September–March
Melrose 1 (a.k.a. White Melrose)		Scotland	<1800	Width 82 mm (3.2 in), height 76 mm (3.0 in). Cells elliptical, abaxile. Flesh is marrow-like, with a sweet and sub-acid flavour.	Eating, cooking	Use October–January
Melrose 2		Ohio, US	Cross made 1932. Selected 1937. Introduced 1944	A yellow to green apple with crimson flush (50%). Width 74 mm (2.9 in), height 63 mm (2.5 in). P Jonathan x Delicious. Flavour improves in storage. Flesh is coarse, aromatic, subacid. Biennial.	Eating	Pick45 October 3. Pick55 September 20. Pickg October 1–20. Use December–April.
Mere de Menage (a.k.a. Bellefleur de France, fr. de Livre, Ménagère)		France or Ukraine	<1800	Large flat-round yellow apple with crimson flush (50–100%). Width 77–128 mm (3.0–5.0 in), height 67–95 mm (2.6–3.7 in). Stalk very stout (4–5 mm (0.16–0.20 in)) and short (10–15 mm (0.39–0.59 in)). Cells roundish, obovate, abaxile. TRI	Cooking	PickE late September. Use October–November.
Merton Beauty		England	1932, selected 1946, introduced 1962	Width 56–67 mm (2.2–2.6 in), height 45–53 mm (1.8–2.1 in). Stalk 20–27 mm (0.79–1.06 in). P Ellisons Orange x Cox Orange. A greenish-yellow apple flushed with red. Flesh with aniseed flavour.	Eating	PickE early September; use September–early October
Merton Charm		Surrey, England	Cross made 1933, introduced 1962	Width 57–60 mm (2.2–2.4 in), height 47–51 mm (1.9–2.0 in). Stalk 10–15 mm (0.39–0.59 in). P Rogers McIntosh x Cox Orange. AM from RHS in 1960. Pick September. Semi-weeping habit, heavy crops of small fruit unless thinned.	Eating	Pick mid-September; use September–October
Merton Delight		England	Introduced 1953	P Cox Orange x Golden Russet. Flesh is tender, crisp sweet to subacid.	Eating	
Merton Joy		England	Cross made 1940 or 1946, introduced 1965.	Width 63–69 mm (2.5–2.7 in), height 51–58 mm (2.0–2.3 in). P (Cox Orange x Sturmer Pippin) x Cox Orange. Flesh is soft, very juicy, sweet, aromatic.	Eating	PickE early to mid-September. Use September–early October.
Merton Knave		Bayfordbury, Hertford, England	Cross made 1948	Greenish yellow with red flush. P Laxton's Early Crimson x Epicure. Width 55–70 mm (2.2–2.8 in), height 48–62 mm (1.9–2.4 in). Stalk 12–30 mm (0.47–1.18 in). Flesh fairly juicy with strong aroma.	Eating	Pick mid-September; use September
Merton Pippin		England	Introduced 1948	A large apple. P Cox Orange x Sturmer Pippin. Flesh subacid.	Eating	
Merton Prolific		England	1914, selected 1935	Width 61 mm (2.4 in), height 50 mm (2.0 in). Flesh sweet, subacid. P Northern Greening x Cox Orange Pippin.	Eating	Use December–January
Merton Reinette		England	Raised 1933, introduced 1962.	Parentage Cox Orange Pippin x Herrings Pippin. Flesh cream colored, aromatic, subacid.	Eating	
Merton Russet		England	1921, selected 1935, introduced 1948	Width 57 mm (2.2 in), height 54 mm (2.1 in). P Sturmer Pippin x Cox Orange. Flesh sweet, subacid. Particularly attractive blossom.	Eating	Use January–March
Merton Worcester		England	Selected 1935, introduced 1948	Width 58–67 mm (2.3–2.6 in), height 55–57 mm (2.2–2.2 in). Stalk 12–20 mm (0.47–0.79 in). P Cox's Orange Pippin × Worcester Pearmain. AM from RHS in 1950. Developed at John Innes Institute. Cold storage 3-4 °C 150 days.	Eating	PickE early September; use September–October
Metzger		Seattle, Washington	Selected 1938. Introduced 1948	P Delicious x Unknown.	Eating	Pick early August
Mexico		Connecticut, US	<1850	Round, medium-sized apple. Crimson red. Stalk long to medium. Flesh is white, juicy, subacid.	Eating	Use August–September
Michaelmas Red (a.k.a. Tydeman's Michaelmas Red)		England	1929, selected 1940, introduced 1945	Width 64 mm (2.5 in), height 56 mm (2.2 in). P McIntosh x Worcester Pearmain. Flesh is soft, juicy, sweet, vinous.	Eating	Pick mid–late September; use October–December
Michal		Israel	Introduced 1967	P (Calville St. Sauveur x Damascus) x Delicious. Flesh is juicy, sweet, subacid. Tree is productive.	Eating	
Middle Green		England	<1903	Yellow streaked with red. Width 63 mm (2.5 in), height 51 mm (2.0 in). AM from RHS in 1903. Flesh, soft, yellowish, sweet, good.	Eating	Use December–February
Miami		New Carlisle, Ohio, US	Discovered 1930, introduced 1935	A red apple. Bud mutation of Stark.	Eating	
Milam (a.k.a. Winter Pearmain, Red Winter Pearmain)		US	<1820	Width 69 mm (2.7 in), height 62 mm (2.4 in). Stalk 20 mm (0.79 in). Flesh white, tender, crisp, juicy, subacid or sweet.	Eating	Use December–January
Miller's Seedling		Berkshire, England	1848	Sweet apple. Width 60–63 mm (2.4–2.5 in), height 44–54 mm (1.7–2.1 in). Stalk 18–26 mm (0.71–1.02 in). Flesh is white, juicy, sweet. AM from RHS in 1906. Tree prefers chalky soils.	Eating	PickE mid-August; use August–September
Millicent Barnes		Chester, England	1903	A yellow apple flushed with red. Width 69 mm (2.7 in), height 63 mm (2.5 in). Flesh lacks flavour. Parentage: Gascoyne's Scarlet x Cox Orange Pippin		PickE mid-September; use October–December
Milton		Geneva, New York	Introduced 1923	P Yellow Transparent x McIntosh.	Eating	
Milwa (see Junami)
Milwaukee		Wisconsin, US	<1899	Width 80 mm (3.1 in), height 65 mm (2.6 in). Stalk 18 mm (0.71 in). Flesh is whitish, firm, crisp, tender, juicy, subacid, fair to good.	Cooking	Use October–January
Minister		New England, US	<1850	Tree healthy, vigorous, early bearer. Flesh, yellowish, juicy, acid.	Cooking	Use September–October
Minjon		Excelsior, Minnesota, US	Selected 1923, introduced 1942	A dark red apple. P probably Wealthy x Jonathan.	Eating	
Minnehaha		Excelsior, Minnesota, US	Selected 1914, introduced 1920	A dark red apple. P Wealthy x (Ben Davis x Fameuse).		
Mio		Sweden	1932	Yellow with red flush. Width 62 mm (2.4 in), height 53 mm (2.1 in). P Worcester pearmain x Oranie.	Eating	Pick September; use September–October
Miss Baron		England	<1885	A golden-yellow apple. Tree vigorous. Flesh yellow, tender, subacid.	Cooking	Use October–January
Missouri Pippin		Missouri, US	c. 1840	Tree is vigorous. Flesh is yellow, firm, brisk, subacid, fair to good.	Eating	Use October–January
Miss Phillimore		England	Introduced 1900	Yellow with red flush. P Gladstone x Lord Burghley. Flesh tender, sweet. AM from RHS in 1899.	Eating	Use October
MN 55 (a.k.a. Rave, First Kiss)		Excelsior, Minnesota, US			Eating	Pick July in Minnesota
Modi		Ferrara, Italy	Selected 1996	A yellow apple with red overcolor (85–95%). Width 75 mm (3.0 in), height 75 mm (3.0 in). Flesh is firm, crisp, juicy, aromatic, subacid. Resistant to scab.	Eating	
Mollie's Delicious		New Jersey, US	1966	Conical shape, pinkish red colour. P (Golden Delicious x Edgewood) x (Gravenstein x Close). Flesh crisp, sweet, good. Lasts long in refrigeration. Good aftertaste.	Eating	Pick55 August 10. PickE late August. Use August–September.
Monarch		Essex, England	Raised 1888, introduced 1918	Large round-conical apple. Width 73–80 mm (2.9–3.1 in), height 58–70 mm (2.3–2.8 in). Stalk 10–20 mm. _Coarse-textured, juicy, tender sharp_ Vitamin C 7 mg/100g. Biennial tendency.	Cooking	PickE mid-September; use November–January
Monmouth		New Jersey, US	<1848	Width 78–85 mm (3.1–3.3 in), height 65–68 mm (2.6–2.7 in). Stalk 13–19 mm (0.51–0.75 in). Biennial. Flesh yellowish, firm, grisp, tender, juicy, aromatic, good to very good.	Eating	Use December–March
Monroe		Geneva, New York	Cross made 1910. Introduced 1949	A red apple. P Jonathan x Rome Beauty.	Eating	Pick50 October 4. PickE mid-October. Use November–January.
Moore Extra		Ohio, US	<1870	Flesh is yellow, juicy, tender, subacid, very good. Stalk short. Tree is vigorous, not an early bearer.	Eating.	Use December–March
Moore's Sweeting (see Black Sweet)
Morden 347		Manitoba, Canada	Introduced 1941	P Martha x Dolgo. Flesh is orange-yellow, firm, crisp, juicy. Tree is hardy, vigorous.	Eating, cooking	Pick late August
Morden 352		Manitoba, Canada	Introduced 1945	P Dolgo x Haralson. Flesh is white, firm, crisp, juicy, sweet, subacid. Tree is very hardy.	Eating, cooking	Pick late September
Morris's Russet		Brentford, England	<1880	A green apple covered with brown russet. Width 63 mm, height 57 mm. Stalk 12 mm. Cells, obovate, axile. Flesh firm, tender, juicy, brisk, aromatic.	Eating	Use October - February
Mother (American Mother)agm		Massachusetts, US	1840	Medium-sized yellow apple with crimson stripes and darker red blush. Width 63–77 mm (2.5–3.0 in), height 60–80 mm (2.4–3.1 in). Stalk 13–23 mm (0.51–0.91 in). Cells elliptical, abaxile. Flesh is fine, tender, juicy, mild subacid, aromatic, very good to best. The fruit has a balsamic aroma with a suggestion of vanilla. Cropping can be a bit irregular, if not completely biennial. A late flowering variety that avoids frost. Some resistance to scab. DBH 128.	Eating	Pick50 September 14. PickE late September. Use October–December.
Munson (a.k.a. Meachem Sweet, Rag Apple)		Possibly Massachusetts, US	<1849	Width 68 mm (2.7 in), height 55 mm (2.2 in). Stalk 14 mm (0.55 in). Flesh is yellowish, tender, juicy, sweet, good to very good.	Eating	Use late September–December
Munson Sweet (a.k.a. Orange Sweet, Ray Apple, Meachem Sweet)		New England, US	<1850	Width 74 mm (2.9 in), height 59 mm (2.3 in). Stalk 18 mm (0.71 in). Tree is vigorous, productive, a regular bearer. Flesh is juicy, very sweet.	Baking	Use September–February
Murray		Canada	1980			
Muscadet de Dieppe		Normandy, France	c. 1750	Commonly used in making Calvados brandy. Yellowish green apple with red striping or reddish pink blush. Too tart to eat.	Cider	
Musch		Belgium	1872		Eating	Pick September; use November–December
Musk (see Carlisle Codlin)
Muster		Indianapolis, US	<1850	Flesh is yellow, juicy, subacid, aromatic.	Cooking, eating	Use November–January
Mutsu		Aomori Prefecture, Japan	Cross made 1930, first fruited 1937, named 1948	Known as "Crispin" in the United Kingdom. Width 73–77 mm (2.9–3.0 in), height 70–73 mm (2.8–2.9 in). Stalk 22–30 mm (0.87–1.18 in). P Golden Delicious x Indo. Flesh is aromatic, subacid. Tree is very vigorous. Cold storage 2 °C 150 days. TRI	Eating, pies	Pick55 September 25. PickE mid-October. Pickg October 15–30. Use late October–early April
My Jewel		Watsonville, California	c. 1940	Originated as a chance seedling, a cross between Winter Banana and Golden Delicious. Yellow colour. October harvest. Still used in cider blends by Martinelli's	Eating, cooking, cider	

=== N ===
Common name	Image	Origin	First developed	Comment	Use	Pick/Use period
Nanny		Surrey or Sussex, England	1842	A dessert apple of excellent quality. Flesh greenish yellow, tender. Width 76 mm (3.0 in), height 69 mm (2.7 in).	Eating	PickE mid-September; use October
Nathusius Taubenapfel		Germany	1824	A conical apple. Width 67 mm (2.6 in), height 62 mm (2.4 in). Stalk 11 mm (0.43 in).	Eating	Use December–April
Nelson Codlin		England	<1850	Large yellow. A first rate culinary apple	Cooking	Use September–January
New Hawthornden		Sawbridgeworth, Hertfordshire, England	Introduced 1847	A yellowish green apple. Width 88 mm, height 63 mm. Stalk 13–25 mm. Cells elliptical, abaxile. Flesh tender, crisp, very juicy, acid. Raised by Rivers Nursery.	Cooking	PickE late-September. Use September–October
Newell-Kimzey (see Airlie Red Flesh)
Newfane		Geneva, New York, US	Introduced 1927	P Deacon Jones x Delicious. Flesh, tender, juicy. Ripens with Delicious.	Eating	
Newton Wonder		Derbyshire, England	<1887	A yellow apple flushed with red. FCC from RHS in 1887. Width 89–92 mm (3.5–3.6 in), height 70–73 mm (2.8–2.9 in). Stalk 10–15 mm (0.39–0.59 in). Medium round and even, beautifully striped and flushed. Very good cooker. Cooks to juicy, brisk, well-flavoured purée, but with less acidity than Bramley. Prolific bearer, can be harvested in winter.	Cooking	PickE mid-October; use November–March
Newtown Delicious		Washington, US	Introduced c. 1937	P Yellow Newtown x Delicious. Tree vigorous, heavy bearer.	Cooking, eating	
Newtown Pippin (Albemarle Pippin, fr. Newtown Pippin, ru Renet angliiskii)		Queens County, New York	1759	Best known colonial apple in North America. Known favourite of Ben Franklin and Thomas Jefferson. Medium to large, often irregularly shaped apple. Greenish-yellow, dotted, often russeted. Width 78 mm (3.1 in), height 60–65 mm (2.4–2.6 in). Stalk 15 mm (0.59 in). Tough skin, flesh cream to greenish-white, very quickly browning. Flesh yellow, firm, crisp, moderately fine-grained, aromatic, subacid, best. Biennial habit, slow to come into bearing. Good keeper, improves with storage. Prized for its clear juice in cider making. Two sports, Green Newtown Pippin and Yellow Newtown Pippin, differ only in skin colour. Cold storage 2 °C 150 days.	Cooking, eating, cider	PickE late October; use November–March
Newtown Spitzenburgh		Newtown, Long Island, US	1817	Width 77 mm (3.0 in), height 59 mm (2.3 in). Stalk 17 mm (0.67 in). Flesh yellow, crisp, tender, vinous, subacid.	Eating	Use October–February
Niagara		Geneva, New York, US	Selected 1950, introduced 1962.	A yellow apple with red flush and stripes. Flesh: white, fine, crisp, tender, aromatic, subacid.	Eating	Pick50 September 8. PickE early September. Use September - October.
Nickajack (a.k.a. Caroline, Berry, Aberdeen, Trenham, Alleghany, Chaltram Pippin)		North Carolina, United States	c. 1810	Native American origin, believed to be originally grown by Cherokee along banks of Nickajack Creek. Only grown in Appalachians, favourite of later settlers for desserts. Rusty red colour with sweet, crisp taste. Width 84 mm (3.3 in), height 67 mm (2.6 in). Stalk 12 mm (0.47 in).	Cooking, eating	Use December–April
Nicola		Summerland, Canada	Cross made 1981, selected 1988	A large apple with 85% red overcolor. P Splendour x Gala. Flesh: light yellow, juicy, firm, crisp.	Eating	
Nonpareil		France	1500s	A yellowish green apple. Width 58–65 mm (2.3–2.6 in), height 48–52 mm (1.9–2.0 in). Stalk 18–28 mm (0.71–1.10 in).	Eating	Pick mid-October; use December–March
Nordhausen (a.k.a. Schöner von Nordhausen)		Germany	1892	Width 69 mm (2.7 in), height 57 mm (2.2 in), weight 130 g (4.6 oz). Stalk 6–13 mm (0.24–0.51 in). Flesh is crisp, subacid to acid. Cold storage 2 °C 150 days. VitC 6. Density 0.74	Cooking	Pick October; use January–April
Norfolk Beauty		Norfolk, England	introduced 1902	Pale cream in colour when cooked. Width 80–87 mm (3.1–3.4 in), height 67–71 mm (2.6–2.8 in). Stalk 8–10 mm (0.31–0.39 in). P Harvey x Hawthornden. FCC from RHS in 1902.	Cooking	Pick early September; use October–December
Norfolk Beefing (a.k.a. Catshead Beaufin, Taliesin)		Norfolk, England	c. 1800	Width 78 mm (3.1 in), height 63 mm (2.5 in). Stalk short. Flesh has a brisk and pleasant flavour. TRI	Baking	Pick October; use January–June
Norfolk Pippin (see Adams Pearmain)
Norfolk Royal		England	1908	A truncate conical apple. Flesh crisp, juicy and well-flavoured. Width 70 mm (2.8 in), height 67 mm (2.6 in). Stalk 8–15 mm (0.31–0.59 in).	Eating	Pick late September; use September–February
Norman's Pippin		Belgium	<1900	Conical grey green with russet, flesh mellow, of fine flavour. AGM from RHS in 1900. Width 63 mm (2.5 in), height 51 mm (2.0 in).	Eating	Use January–March
Northern Greening		Yorkshire, England	1826	Medium, oval, conical, pea green to pale yellow, with red stripes and faint brown flush. Flesh tender, greenish, acid. Growth vigorous.	Cooking	Pick mid-October; use December–April
Northern Spy		New York	c. 1800	Tart, firm, stores very well. Tree large, vigorous. Flesh is yellow, firm, tender, crisp, juicy, aromatic, subacid, very good to best. Noted for being excellent choice for making American-style apple pie. Width 81 mm (3.2 in), height 72 mm (2.8 in). Stalk 20 mm (0.79 in). Sometimes used as a rootstock.	Cider, cooking, eating	Pick45 October 10. Pick55 September 25. PickE mid-October. Use November–March.
North Western Greening		Wisconsin, US	<1872	Width 86 mm (3.4 in), height 79 mm (3.1 in). Stalk 15 mm (0.59 in). Biennial. Flesh is yellowish, crisp, firm, juicy, subacid, fair to good.	Cooking, eating	Pick45 September 18. Use January–April
Notarisappel		Lunteren, Netherlands	1890. Introduced 1899.	A large apple greenish-yellow with orange stripes. Width 87 mm (3.4 in), height 77 mm (3.0 in). Stalk 13 mm (0.51 in). Flesh is soft white, subacid, very good.	Eating.	PickE late September. Use September–November.
Nova Easygro		Kentville, Nova Scotia, Canada	Cross made 1956, introduced 1971	A greenish yellow apple striped or blushed with red. Flesh is creamy white, firm, crisp, juicy, subacid.	Eating	Pick45 September 15. Pick55 September 1. Use September–October.
Novamac		Kentville, Nova Scotia, Canada	Cross made 1963, introduced 1978	A round to conic apple width 70 mm. 80% red stripe on greenish-yellow ground. Flesh white, crisp fine, tender, juicy, subacid, very good. Resistant to apple scab, cedar apple rust and fire blight. Susceptible to mildew.	Eating	Pick with McIntosh
Novaspy		Kentville, Nova Scotia, Canada	Introduced 1986	A Northern Spy like apple. Fruit 30-85% dark red overcolor. Flesh creamy-yellow, fine textured, firm, crisp, juicy, subacid, very good. Resistant to apple scab.	Eating, Cooking	Pick between Delicious and Northern Spy.
Nu-Jon		Washington, US	Introduced 1949	P unknown. A large red striped apple.		
Nutmeg Pippin		England, UK	1920	A conical apple; width 54 mm (2.1 in), height 50 mm (2.0 in). Flesh is juicy, with a nutty flavour.	Eating	PickE late September; use December–March
Nyack		New York, US	<1850	Flesh white, juicy, acid, rich.	Eating	Use December

=== O ===
Common name	Image	Origin	First developed	Comment	Use	Pick/Use period
Oakland		Michigan, US	<1883	Width 72 mm (2.8 in), height 58 mm (2.3 in). Stalk 22 mm (0.87 in). Biennial. Flesh is white, tender, juicy, sweet, crisp, good.	Eating	Use November–February
Oberdieck's Reinette (see Reinette Oberdieck)
Oberdieck's Taubenapfel		Germany	<1860	A conical apple. Width 57 mm (2.2 in), height 60 mm (2.4 in). Stalk 12 mm (0.47 in).	Eating	Use December–February
Oberländer Himbeerapfel (fr. Framboise, pl. Malinowa Oberlandzka)		Germany	<1854	Width 70 mm, height 58–60 mm. Stalk 10–16 mm. Flesh yellowish-white, juicy, aromatic, subacid. Vitamin C 14 mg/100g.	Eating	Pick September. Use October - March.
Ogden		Geneva, New York, US	Introduced 1928	P Zusoff x McIntosh. Flesh is white, aromatic, sweet.	Baking	
Ohio Beauty synonym of Grosh
Ohio Beauty synonym of Western Beauty
Ohio Nonpareil		Ohio, US	<1853	Width 95 mm (3.7 in), height 73 mm (2.9 in). Stalk 10 mm (0.39 in). Flesh is yellow, juicy, subacid. Tree is vigorous, healthy. DBH 137.	Cooking, eating, drying	Use September–December. Pick50 September 18.
Ohio Pippin		Ohio, US	<1867	Width 99 mm (3.9 in), height 74 mm (2.9 in). Stalk 13 mm (0.51 in). Tree is healthy, vigorous. Flesh is yellowish, tender, juicy, acid to subacid.	Cooking	Use December–January
Ó:IASE		Quebec, Canada	2024		Eating.	
Ökna vita Vintergylling		Sweden	<1900	A small yellow conical apple. Width and height 60 mm (2.4 in).	Cooking, eating.	Use December–April.
Ökna Lökäpple		Sweden	<1830	Greenish yellow with some red stripes. Width 64 mm (2.5 in), height 50 mm (2.0 in). Stalk 10 mm (0.39 in).	Eating	Pick October. Use December–February.
Ölands Kungsäpple		Sweden	<1850	A small red conical apple. Width 66 mm (2.6 in), height 56 mm (2.2 in). Stalk 8 mm (0.31 in).	Eating	Use November–December.
Oldenburg		Geisenheim, Germany	1897	A yellow-green apple with red flush. P Minister von Hammerstein x Baumanns Renette. Flesh; soft, juicy, subacid. VitC 3. Density 0.80	Eating	Pick September; use October–December
Oldenburg 2 (see Duchess of Oldenburg)
Oliver		Arkansas	<1873	Width 69 mm (2.7 in), height 57 mm (2.2 in). Stalk 10 mm (0.39 in). Flesh is whitish, crisp, tender, juicy, subacid, sweet, good to very good.	Eating	Use December–March
Ontario		Ontario, Canada	Cross made 1820. Introduced 1882.	A large apple, greenish-yellow with purple flush. Width 75 mm (3.0 in), height 58 mm (2.3 in). Weight 191 g (6.7 oz). P Wagener x Northern Spy. Cold storage 5 °C 150 days. VitC 16–30. Density 0.83	Eating, cooking, juice	PickE mid-October. PickG late October–early November. Pickg October 23–November 7. Use November–April
Opal		Chelmsford, Essex, England	<1936	Parentage Rival x Worcester Pearmain. Flesh crisp, juicy, strawberry flavour.	Eating	PickE early September. Use September - October.
Opal		Czech Republic	1999	Firm, fine to medium grained, medium juicy, full flavoured, sweet, mild-subacid. Parentage Golden Delicious x Topaz.	Eating	
Opalescent		Ohio, US	<1899	Width 98 mm (3.9 in), height 92 mm (3.6 in). Stalk 20 mm (0.79 in). Flesh is juicy, subacid, aromatic, good to very good.	Eating	Use November–February
Orin		Fukushima, Japan	1952	A large apple 250-300 gram. Sweet and distinctive fragrance. Flesh firm, aromatic, sweet, juicy, notes of pineapple, excellent. Medium hardness. Parentage Golden Delicious x Indo.	Eating	PickE late October. Use November–January.
Oriole		Minnesota, US	Introduced 1949	P unknown. Flesh is tender, juicy, aromatic, subacid.	Cooking, eating	Pick August. Use August.
Orleans		Geneva, New York, US	Introduced 1924	A yellow apple, sttriped with red. P Deacon Jones x Delicious. Width 60–75 mm (2.4–3.0 in), height 50–65 mm (2.0–2.6 in).	Eating	PickE late September. Use October–January
Orleans Reinette (a.k.a. Golden Reinette, ru. Orleanskii renet, Krasnîi şafran, Zimnii şafran)		Orleans, France	<1776	Medium flat, rich red and golden russet. Reliable bearer. Width 62–74 mm (2.4–2.9 in), height 58–62 mm (2.3–2.4 in). Stalk 6–20 mm (0.24–0.79 in). E VitC 22. Flesh is creamy white, firm, complex flavour, Golden Reinett x unknown, related to Blenheim Orange. TRI	Eating	PickE mid-October; use December–February
Ortley (a.k.a. White Bellflower, Cleopatra)		New Jersey, US	<1850	A large yellow apple with red flush. Width 71 mm (2.8 in), height 70 mm (2.8 in). Flesh yellowish, crisp, tender, juicy, acid to subacid, very good. Tree vigorous, very productive.	Cooking, eating	PickE late October; use November–January
Osceola		Indiana, US	<1850	Width 84 mm (3.3 in), height 72 mm (2.8 in). Stalk 13 mm (0.51 in). Flesh is yellow, juicy, subacid.	Eating	Use January–March
Oskaloosa (a.k.a. Jack, Apple)		Iowa, US	<1850	Flesh is juicy, subacid. Tree is a moderate grower, early but not an abundant bearer.		Use November
Osnabrücker Reinette (fr. Reinette d'Osnabruck)		Germany	<1800	A yellow apple with russet. Width 66 mm, height 54 mm. Stalk 15 mm. Flesh yellowish, subacid.	Eating, Cooking	Pick October. Use December - March
Owen Thomas		Bedfordshire, England	Raised 1897, introduced 1920	Width 57–63 mm (2.2–2.5 in), height 51 mm (2.0 in). Stalk 7–15 mm (0.28–0.59 in). Green with orange flush. P Cox Orange x Gladstone. Flesh is greenish-white, soft, juicy, sweet, aromatic.	Eating	Pick mid-August; use late August–early September.
Ozark Gold		Missouri, US	1970	Light green with pink blush. Has taste with notes of honey.	Eating	PickE late September–early October. Use October–December.

=== P ===
Common name	Image	Origin	First developed	Comment	Use	Pick/Use period
Pacific Rose		New Zealand	1995	Extremely crisp, sweet apple. Also grows well in California.	Eating	
Pam's Delight		Bedfordshire, England	1958	A medium-sized apple with a red blush. Flesh is crisp, juicy and sweet-tasting.	Eating	
Paragon		Tennessee, US	c. 1830	Tree is vigorous. Flesh is yellow, firm, tender, juicy, aromatic, mild subacid, good to very good.		
Park (a.k.a. Park Spice, Park Apple)		New York, US	<1870	Flesh is yellowish, firm, juicy, subacid, aromatic, very good. Stalk is short. Tree is very productive.	Eating	Use December–March
Paroquet		Berkshire, England	<1899	A red apple with russet. Width 64 mm (2.5 in), height 57 mm (2.2 in). Stalk is short. AM from RHS in 1899. Flesh is yellowish, tender, fair.	Eating, cooking	Use October–January
Parry White		Possibly Pennsylvania, US	<1872	Width 59–71 mm (2.3–2.8 in), height 62 mm (2.4 in). Stalk 18 mm (0.71 in). Flesh is white, tender, juicy, subacid, good.	Eating	Use late August–October
Pater van den Elzen		Limburg, Netherlands	Introduced 1934	A yellow apple with red flush (50–90%). Width 81 mm (3.2 in), height 68 mm (2.7 in). Stalk 20 mm (0.79 in).	Cooking	Use January–March
Patten		Wisconsin, US	<1869	Width 85 mm (3.3 in), height 70 mm (2.8 in). Stalk 10–17 mm (0.39–0.67 in). Flesh is tender, juicy, subacid, good.	Cooking	Use October–January
Patricia		Ontario, Canada	Selected 1920	P McIntosh x unknown. Tree is a heavy bearer.	Eating	Pick mid-September. Use October–November.
Paula Red		Kent County, Michigan, US	1960s	Firm white flesh; McIntosh mutation.	Eating	Pick45 August 15. Pick55 August 3. PickE early–mid-September. Use October–November.
Pawpaw (a.k.a. Western Baldwin, Rubicon, Ball Apple)		Michigan, US	<1875	Flesh is yellowish, juicy, firm, brisk, subacid, very good. Stalk is medium length. Tree is hardy, and a regular bearer.	Eating	Use December–June
Payette		Idaho	Selected 1936. Introduced 1944.	A red apple. P Ben Davis x Wagener.	Eating	Pick mid-October. Use November–April.
Peacemaker		Berkshire, England	<1913	Round and smooth, with crimson flush and stripings. Resembles Charles Ross in general charasteristics. AGM from RHS in 1913. Width 69 mm (2.7 in), height 57 mm (2.2 in).	Eating	Pick early September. Use September–October.
Peach-Pound Sweet		New York, US	<1875	Width 72 mm (2.8 in), height 54 mm (2.1 in). Stalk 16 mm (0.63 in). Flesh is juicy, sweet. Very good.	Eating	Use September–November
Pearl		Essex, England	1983	Yellow apple flushed with red on 50%. P Worcester Pearmain x Rival. Width 68 mm (2.7 in), height 64 mm (2.5 in). Stalk is short. Flesh is creamy white, juicy, sweet, aromatic.	Eating	Pick late September–early October; use October–November
Pease (a.k.a. Walter Pease, Pease Walter)		Connecticut, US	<1895	Width 88 mm (3.5 in), height 67 mm (2.6 in). Stalk 11 mm (0.43 in). Flesh is whitish, crisp, tender, juicy, aromatic, subacid, good to very good.	Eating	Pick late September–early August; use October–January
Peasgood's Nonsuch (cs. Peasgoodovo, de. Peasgood's Goldreinette, fr. Sans pareil Peasgood, Peasgood's Sondergleichen, ru. Renet Piguda, Renet zolotoi Pisguda, Nesravnenno) agm		England	1858	Width 83–92 mm (3.3–3.6 in), height 70–76 mm (2.8–3.0 in). Stalk 8 mm (0.31 in). Cells obovate, axile. A very large yellowish-green apple, deepening to orange-yellow, flushed and striped red with some russet patches. Flesh is white, sweet and juicy. Good eating and superb for cooking. Large, hardy and heavy cropping tree. Apples can weigh up to half a kilogram, and are famously large enough to make a pie from a single apple. VitC 13.	Cooking, eating	Pick mid-September. Use September–December.
Peck's Pleasant (a.k.a. Peck, Waltz Apple)		Connecticut, US		Yellow with red flush. Width 85 mm (3.3 in), height 64–68 mm (2.5–2.7 in). Stalk 9–13 mm (0.35–0.51 in). Flesh is juicy, subacid, highly aromatic, very good to best.	Eating	Pick mid-October. Use November–March
Pederstrup		Denmark	<1828	A medium-sized cooking apple. Width 72 mm (2.8 in), height 60 mm (2.4 in). Stalk 10 mm (0.39 in).	Cooking	Pick late September. Use November–January
Pekka		Finland	Introduced 1999	A dark red apple. Flesh is subacid, sweet. P Lobo x Huvitus.	Eating	Pick mid-September; use September–October
Pennock (a.k.a. Romanie, Big Romanie, Pennock's Red Winter)		Pennsylvania, US	<1820	Apple is very large. Stalk is short. Flesh is yellow, tender, juicy, subacid. Quality poor. Tree is vigorous, very productive.	Cooking	Use November - March.
Perry Russet		US	<1850	Width 86 mm (3.4 in), height 64 mm (2.5 in). Stalk 18 mm (0.71 in). Flesh is yellow, acid.	Cooking, eating	Use December–January
Petteri		Finland	Introduced 2003	A dark red appel. P Lobo x Huvitus. Flesh is subacid, aromatic.	Eating	Pick late August
Pewaukee		Wisconsin, US	c. 1870	Tree vigorous. Width 68 mm (2.7 in), height 58 mm (2.3 in). Stalk 10 mm (0.39 in). Flesh is white, firm tender, juicy, aromatic, subacid, fair to good.	Eating	Pick early October. Use November–April
Pfirsichroter Sommerapfel (fr. Pomme d'été rouge-carmin, ru. Persikovoe letnee)		France	<1830	Yellow with red flush. Width 62–65 mm (2.4–2.6 in), height 50–54 mm (2.0–2.1 in). Stalk 15–20 mm (0.59–0.79 in). VitC 14	Eating	Pick August; use August–September.
Pickard's Reserve		Indiana, US	<1850	Width 82 mm (3.2 in), height 65 mm (2.6 in). Stalk 13 mm (0.51 in). Flesh is whitish-yellow, tender, juicy, subacid, aromatic.	Cooking, eating	Use December–January
Pikant		Dresden-Pillnitz, Germany	Introduced 1988	A green to yellow apple with red overcolor (70–80%). P Undine x Carola. Flesh ks juicy, subacid.	Eating, cooking, juice	Pick early–mid-September. Use September–December.
Pilot		Dresden-Pillnitz, Germany	Developed 1962, introduced 1988	A conical apple, yellow with red flush. Width 65–70 mm (2.6–2.8 in), height 55–65 mm (2.2–2.6 in), weight 120 g (4.2 oz). P Clivia x Undine. Flesh is yellowish, crisp, aromatic, subacid. Cold Storage 1 °C 120 days.	Eating	Pick mid-October. PickG early–mid-October; use February–July
Pimona		Dresden-Pillnitz, Germany	Introduced 1985	P Clivia x Undine. Flesh is crisp, juicy, subacid, aromatic. Cold storage 3 °C 120 days.	Eating, cooking	
Pine Apple Russet (a.k.a. Hardingham's Russet)		England	1730	Width 70 mm, height 64 mm. Stalk 25 mm. Flesh pale yellow, tender, crisp, juicy, aromatic, subacid. Can be dry, flavourless. Cells obovate, axile, open.	Eating	Pick early September. Use October - November.
Pine Golden Pippin		UK	<1861	A golden yellow apple with russet. Width 69 mm (2.7 in), height 63 mm (2.5 in). Flesh is white, firm, fine-textured, juicy, aromatic.	Eating	PickE early October. Use November–February
Pink Lady (see Cripps Pink)
Pink Pearl		California, US	Introduced 1944	Noted for having bright pink flesh. P Surprise x unknown. Sweet. Possibly has crab apple in its ancestry. Makes cider with a reddish tint if pressed.	Eating	Pick September
Pinova		Dresden-Pillnitz, Germany	1965, introduced 1986	Bred in Germany over an 18-year period. Marketed as "Piñata" in the United States. Fragrant smell, thin skin and balanced sweet and tart flavour profile. From Clivia x Golden Delicious. Width 60–65 mm (2.4–2.6 in), height 50–60 mm (2.0–2.4 in), weight 125 g (4.4 oz). Stalk 30 mm (1.2 in). Flesh is yellowish, crisp, subacid, aromatic. Cold storage 1-2 °C 120 days.	Cooking, eating	PickE early–mid-October. PickG mid–late October; use December–May
Pirja		Finland	Introduced 1980	A red apple. P Huvitus x Melba. Flesh subacid.	Eating	Pick early August
Piros		Dresden-Pillnitz, Germany	1963. Introduced 1985	A green apple with red flush. P Helios x Apollo. Width 65–75 mm (2.6–3.0 in), height 60–75 mm (2.4–3.0 in). Weight 130 g (4.6 oz). Stalk 26 mm (1.0 in). Flesh is soft, juicy, subacid, aromatic. Cold storage 3 °C 20 days.	Eating	PickG early August; use August–September
Pitmaston Pineapple		Moseley, Worcester, England	c. 1785	A dessert apple known since 1785. Small oblong apples with a yellow-green russeted skin. Width 53 mm (2.1 in), height 49 mm (1.9 in). Stalk medium. Flesh is yellow, firm, juicy, intense nutty, honeyed flavour with, as the name suggests, tropical undertones and some balancing acidity. Trees are biennial but produce heavy crops in the 'on' year.	Eating	Pick mid-September; use October–December
Pixie agm		England	1947	Resistant to scab and mildew. Width 64 mm (2.5 in), height 51 mm (2.0 in). Stalk 20 mm (0.79 in). Flesh is creamy white, crisp, intensely aromatic, Cox-like flavour, but sharper. FCC from RHS in 1972.	Eating	Pick early–mid-October; use December–March
Pixie Crunch (a.k.a. Coop 33)		New Jersey, US	Cross made 1971, selected 1978	A greenish-yellow apple with purple-red overcolor (90–100%). Width 66–74 mm (2.6–2.9 in), height 56–63 mm (2.2–2.5 in). Stalk 18 mm (0.71 in). SS 12.3. Flesh is yellow-white, crisp, breaking, juicy, subacid.	Eating	Pick September 12–18. Use September–November.
Pohorka		Yugoslavia	1960	P Cox Orange x Ontario. Flesh is juicy, aromatic, subacid.	Eating	PickE late October. PickG early October. Use December–June.
Pomme Grise			<1850	Width 61–63 mm (2.4–2.5 in), height 45–50 mm (1.8–2.0 in). Stalk 12–14 mm (0.47–0.55 in). Flesh is yellow, juicy, aromatic, subacid, delicious.	Eating	Use January–March
Pomme Royale (see Dyer)
Pommerscher Krummstiel (a.k.a. Krummstiel, Krummstengel, Gestreifter Römerapfel)		Vorpommern, Germany	<1798	A yellow apple with red stripes. Width 65–80 mm (2.6–3.1 in), height 65–80 mm (2.6–3.1 in). Stalk 20–25 mm (0.79–0.98 in). Flesh is greenish-white, juicy, subacid. Quality: cooking good, eating fair.	Cooking	Pick October; use November–February
Ponyik alma (a.k.a. Poinikapfel)		Hungary	<1872	A green yellow apple with brown overcolour. Width 76 mm (3.0 in), height 57 mm (2.2 in).	Eating	Pick mid-October. Use November–January.
Poorhouse		Kentucky, US	<1880	Flesh yellow, juicy, subacid. Very good.	Eating	Use December
Porter's		Sherburne, Massachusetts, US	<1850	Width 72 mm (2.8 in), height 72 mm (2.8 in). Stalk 23 mm (0.91 in). Smallish, squat, deep golden yellow colour with red blush and firm, Flesh is yellow, fine-grained, aromatic, subacid, good to very good. Tree is vigorous, healthy, productive.	Eating, cooking, cider	Use August–October. Pick E September.
Pott's Seedling		Cheshire, England	1849	Pale green to yellow colour. Width 81 mm (3.2 in), height 67 mm (2.6 in). Stalk length is variable. Flesh is greenish white, soft, acid.	Cooking	Pick early September; use September–October
Pound Sweet (a.k.a. Briar Sweet)		Manchester, Connecticut, US	1834	Amber coloration. Used mostly for making apple butter. Russets. Does well in moderate cold. Suitable to areas with snowy winters.	Cooking	
Prairie Spy		Excelsior, Minnesota	Cross made 1913, selected 1923, introduced 1940.	P unknown. Flesh is crisp, juicy. Fruit most nearly resembles Northern Spy.	Eating, cooking	Pick October
Present van Holland		Netherlands	Introduced 1940	A yellow to greenish apple with red stripes. Width 77 mm (3.0 in), height 73 mm (2.9 in). Stalk 18 mm (0.71 in). Flesh is white, juicy, subacid. P Present van Engeland x Brabant Bellefleur.	Eating	Use January–April
Priam		Lafayette, Indiana, US	Cross made 1951, first fruited 1956, introduced 1971	Greenish yellow, striped or blushed with red. Width 65–75 mm (2.6–3.0 in), height 60–70 mm (2.4–2.8 in). Stalk 8 mm (0.31 in). Flesh is creamy white, crisp, subacid. Ripens with Cortland.	Eating	Pick one week before Delicious. Use October–January.
Priestly		Pennsylvania, US	<1820	Flesh is white, juicy, aromatic. Tree is vigorous, productive.	Eating. Cooking.	Use December–March
Prima (a.k.a. Co-op 2)		United States	1958, introduced 1970	Resistant to scab and most diseases. Ripens 3 weeks before Jonathan.	Eating	Pick45 September 3. Pick55 August 27.
Primevére		New York, US	Cross made 1962. Selected 1969.	A red apple. Width 68–76 mm (2.7–3.0 in), height 65–76 mm (2.6–3.0 in). Stalk is short. Flesh is pale green, firm, crisp. Tree is vigorous.	Eating	Pick October 7–10. Use October–March.
Primate (a.k.a. Scott, Powers, July Apple)		US	<1830	Width 72–94 mm (2.8–3.7 in), height 62–76 mm (2.4–3.0 in). Stalk 16–25 mm (0.63–0.98 in). Tree is hardy, very productive. Flesh is white, tender, subacid, very good or best.	Eating	Pick late August; use September–October
Primicia		New Jersey, US/Brazil	Cross made 1975, selected 1982.	Yellow with red overcolor (80–100%). P D1R101T117 x D1R103T245. Flesh is juicy, subacid, fair. Tree is very productive.	Eating	Pick 3 week before Gala.
Primula		Poland				
Princesa		Brazil	Introduced 1988	P NJ 56 x Anna. Flesh is sweet, subacid.	Eating	
Prinzenapfel (see Melonenapfel)
Priscilla (a.k.a. Co-op 4)		US	Introduced 1972	A red apple.	Eating	Pick45 September 4. Pick55 August 28.
Pristine (a.k.a. Coop 32)		West Lafayette, Indiana, United States	Cross made 1974, selected 1982, introduced 1994	A lemon yellow apple. Resistant to most diseases. Width 64–70 mm (2.5–2.8 in), height 56–66 mm (2.2–2.6 in). Overcolor 8%. Flesh is yellow, crisp, subacid.	Eating	Pick45 July 30. Pick55 July 20. Use August.
Pryor Red		Virginia, US	<1830	Width 80 mm (3.1 in), height 62 mm (2.4 in). Stalk 17 mm (0.67 in). Flesh is yellow, tender, juicy, subacid.	Eating	Use January–March
Pumpkin Sweet		Connecticut, US	<1834	A very large sweet apple. Width 77 mm (3.0 in), height 71 mm (2.8 in). Stalk 17 mm (0.67 in). Biennial. Flesh is white, firm, crisp, juicy, very sweet, peculiar flavor. Quality good for baking.	Baking, cooking	Use September–October
Puritan		Amherst, Massachusetts, US	Cross made c. 1931, Introduced 1953	A red apple with white flesh, medium size. Tendency to bear biennially. Parentage McIntosh x Red Astrachan.	Eating	Pick an use as Early McIntosh.
Purpurroter Cousinot (nl. Roode Kroons-Appel)		Possibly Holland	<1760	A yellow apple striped with red. Width 60–70 mm (2.4–2.8 in), height 55–65 mm (2.2–2.6 in).	Cooking, juice	Use December–May.

=== Q ===
Common name	Image	Origin	First developed	Comment	Use	Pick/Use period
Queen		Essex, England	Raised 1858, introduced 1880	Large cooking apple. FCC from RHS in 1880. Width 78–89 mm (3.1–3.5 in), height 57–64 mm (2.2–2.5 in). Stalk 13–18 mm (0.51–0.71 in). Cells ovate, axile.	Cooking	Pick late August; use September–December
Querina see Florina
Quince (a.k.a. Cole's Quince)		US	<1850	A medium-sized ribbed apple. Flesh is yellowish-white, juicy, aromatic, subacid.	Cooking	Use November–January
Quinte		Canada	1964	A red oblong apple. Width 68 mm (2.7 in), height 65 mm (2.6 in). P Crimson Beauty x Red Melba.	Eating	Pick August
Quittenförmiger Gulderling		Germany	<1830	Width 62–78 mm (2.4–3.1 in), height 56–80 mm (2.2–3.1 in). Stalk 6 mm (0.24 in).	Cooking	Use November–February

=== R ===
Common name	Image	Origin	First developed	Comment	Use	Pick/Use period
Råby Rubin		Sweden	c. 1960	A small greenish-yellow apple with red flush. Flesh is juicy, subacid, aromatic, good.	Eating	Pick October; use October–December
Rafzubin see Rubinette
Ragan (a.k.a. Ragan's Red)		Indiana, US	<1870	A green apple striped with red. Flesh is yellowish-white, pleasant, juicy, spicy, subacid. Tree is hardy, vigorous.	Eating	Use October–November
Rainha		Brazil	1975	P Golden Delicious x Valinhense. Flesh is sweet, subacid.	Eating	
Rajka		Czechoslovakia	1983	A scab-resistant apple. Parentage: Shampion x (Jolana x Rubin).	Eating	Pick 10 days before Golden Delicious.
Ralls Janet (a.k.a. Ralls, Ralls Genet, Rawle's Janett, Raule's Genet)		Virginia, US	c. 1800	Biennial. Width 73 mm (2.9 in), height 67 mm (2.6 in). Stalk 16 mm (0.63 in). Flesh is white, firm, crisp, tender, juicy, subacid, very good.	Eating	Use November–April
Rambo (a.k.a. Romanite of New Jersey, Bread and Cheese)		US	<1850	Width 78 mm (3.1 in), height 60 mm (2.4 in). Stalk 15 mm (0.59 in). Flesh is greenish-white, tender, juicy, subacid, aromatic, vinous. DBH 160.	Cooking, eating	Pick50 October 10. Use October–December
Rambour de Flandre (see Flandrischer Rambour)
Rambour d'Hiver (a.k.a. Rambour Rouge, Rambour Doux)		France	1628	A green apple with red stripes. Width 75–105 mm (3.0–4.1 in), height 55–85 mm (2.2–3.3 in), weight 280 g (9.9 oz). Stalk 16–19 mm (0.63–0.75 in).	Eating, cooking	
Rambour Franc (a.k.a. Lothringer Rambour, Müschens Rosenapfel)		France	1665	Yellow green with red flush. Width 87–112 mm (3.4–4.4 in), height 60–86 mm (2.4–3.4 in). Stalk 11 mm (0.43 in). DBH 119.	Eating, cooking	Pick50 September 4. Use October–November
Rambour Papeleu		Crimera, Ukraine	1850	Green with red flush. Width 77 mm (3.0 in), height 67 mm (2.6 in).	Eating, cooking	Pick October; use October–December
Ramsdell (a.k.a. Ramsdell Sweet, Hurlbut, fr. Ramsdell)		Connecticut, US	c. 1838	Width 90 mm (3.5 in), height 89 mm (3.5 in). Stalk 14 mm (0.55 in). Flesh is yellow, firm, tender, juicy, very sweet, good to very good.	Baking	Use September
Raritan		New Jersey, US	raised 1949	A green apple flushed with red (70-90%). Width 62–69 mm, height 58mm. Stalk 18 mm. Flesh: crisp, juicy, subacid, flavour of raspberries. P (Melba X Sonora) X (Melba X ( Williams X Starr)). Scab resistant.	Eating	PickE mid-August. Use August–September.
Rawle's Janett see Ralls Janet
Reanda		Germany	1993	A red apple resistant to scab and fire-blight.	Eating, cooking	Pick September; use October–January
Rebella		Dresden-Pilnitz, Germany	Selected 1986	A yellow apple with red overcolor. Flesh is creamy-white, crisp, firm, aromatic. Resistant to apple scab, powdery mildew and fire blight.	Eating	
Red and Green Sweet		US	<1817	Stalk short to medium. Flesh is white, tender, juicy, sweet.	Eating	Use August–September
Red Astrachan (cs. Astrachan červený, de. Roter Astrachan, fr. Astracan rouge, pl. Oliwka czerwona)		Russia or Sweden	c. 1800	Extremely resistant to frost. Width 60–82 mm (2.4–3.2 in), height 76–83 mm (3.0–3.3 in). Stalk 12–14 mm (0.47–0.55 in). Cells ovate, axile. Flesh is white, fine, crisp, tender, juicy, subacid, aromatic, good to very good. The tree does not attain a large size. VitC 12.	Cooking	Pick August; use August
Red Autumn Calville (hu. Őszi piros kálvil, de. Roter Herbstkalvill, fr. Calleville rouge d'automne, sk. Červený jesenný hranáč)		France or Germany	1617 or 1670	Flesh is tender and reddish in colour with a somewhat peach-like flavour. Skin is smooth. Large seed cavity leading to a rattling noise from the seeds.	Cooking and Dessert	Pick and use in Autumn
Red Canada (a.k.a. Poland, Richfield Nonsuch)		US	<1820	Width 74–81 mm (2.9–3.2 in), height 61–67 mm (2.4–2.6 in). Stalk 17–21 mm (0.67–0.83 in). Flesh is white, tender, crisp. Very good.	Eating	Use January–May
Red Delicious		Iowa, US	c. 1870	Unmistakable for its acutely conic shape, dark red colour and telltale bumps on bottom. Width 70 mm (2.8 in), height 70 mm (2.8 in). Stalk 19–22 mm (0.75–0.87 in). Flavour is sweet and mild. Extremely poor choice for cooking or cider; tastes terrible in pies. Original seedling known as "Hawkeye." Rights bought by Stark Brothers in 1893. First marketed as "Delicious" or "Stark's Delicious," name changed to "Red Delicious" in 1914 when Stark bought the rights to Mullin's Yellow Seedling, changing that apple's name to "Yellow Delicious". Red Delicious has many sports and ranks as the world's most prolific apple. Cold Storage 0.5 °C 120 days. DBH 142-153.	Eating	Pick45 October 12. Pick55 September 10. Use December–March
Red Devil		Kent, England	raised 1975	A green apple with scarlet flush (90%). Width 74–83 mm, height 55-70mm. Stalk 7 mm. Flesh pink-white, crisp, juicy, aromatic, subacid, strawberry flavour. P Discovery x Kent	Eating, juice	PickE late September. Use October–December.
Red Duchess		New York, US	1914. Introduced 1937	A red mutant of Duchess.		
Red Falstaff agm				Falstaff sport with red/orange flush to the skin, late, prolific	Eating	
Redfree (a.k.a. Coop 13)		US	Introduced 1981	A yellow apple with red stripes (80–90%). P Raritan x PRI 1018–101. Flesh is firm, subacid, good. Stalk 22 mm (0.87 in).	Eating	Pick45 August 15. Pick55 August 5. Use August–September.
Redgold		Washington	Selected 1936, introduced 1946	P Golden Delicious x Richared Delicious.	Eating	
Red Graham		Manistee, Michigan	Discovered 1926. Introduced 1936	Mutation of Northern Spy.	Cooking	Ripens with McIntosh.
Red Gravenstein		Washington, US	Discovered 1907 or 1908, introduced 1924.	A red sport of Gravenstein. DBH 109.	Eating, cooking, pie	Pick50 August 22.
Red June (a.k.a. Red Juneating, Carolina Red June)		North Carolina, US	<1848	Flesh white, fine, tender juicy, subacid, good to very good. Width 55–65 mm (2.2–2.6 in), height 57–67 mm (2.2–2.6 in). Stalk 13–20 mm (0.51–0.79 in).	Eating	Use August–October
Red Juneating 1. see Red June
Red Juneating 2. see Early Strawberry
Red Juneating 3. see Margaret
Red Prince		Weert, Netherlands	1994	Medium-sized, conic, uniform deep red skin. Flesh is white, crisp, sweet and juicy, with hints of cherry and almond. Excellent keeper. Chance seedling (a natural cross of Jonathan and Golden Delicious) discovered in 1994. Marketed throughout Europe, in 2001, Global Fruit in Ontario became exclusive growers of the variety in North America.	Eating, cooking	
Red Russet		New Hampshire, US	<1875	Stalk is short. Flesh is yellow, crisp, tender, subacid. Very good.	Eating	Use January–April
Red Sauce		Geneva, New York, US	1917, introduced 1926	P Deacon Jones x Wealthy. Flesh is subacid.	Cooking	Use October
Red Spy		New York, US	Introduced 1923	Mutation of Northern Spy.	Cooking	
Red Stripe		Possibly Indiana, US	<1850	Stalk is short. Flesh is whitish, tender, acid, juicy.	Cooking, eating	Use July–August
Red Striped Graham		Manistee, Michigan, US	Discovered 1926, introduced 1936	A striped apple. Bud mutation of Northern Spy. Tree growth is similar to Northern Spy.		Ripens with McIntosh
Red Winesap (a.k.a. Strand Winesap)		Yakima, Washington, US	Discovered 1927. Introduced 1928 or 1930	P unknown.		
Red Winter Pearmain 1. see Buncombe
Red Winter Pearmain 2. see Kaighn
Red Winter Pearmain 3. see Long Red Pearmain
Red Winter Pearmain 4. see Milam
Red Winter Pearmain 5. see Westfield Seek-No-Further
Red York Imperial see Colora Red York
Reglindis		Germany	1990	Yellow with red flush. Sugar 10.6%, acid 0.83%, juice yield 80%.	Cooking, juice	Pick September; use October–November
Reinette Clochard		France	<1850	Width 67–73 mm, height 58 mm. Stalk short. Flesh yellowish, juicy, subacid. Tree vigorous.	Eating, Cooking	PickE mid-October. Use January–March.
Reinette de Bayeux		France	<1817	Width 70–75 mm, height 58–65 mm. Stalk 8–22 mm. Flesh cream colored, firm, crisp, subacid, aromatic. TRIPLOID.	Eating, Cooking, Pie	Use November - March
Reinette de Breda (see Breda Reinette)
Reinette de Bretange		France	<1670	Width 73 mm (2.9 in), height 55 mm (2.2 in). Stalk 8 mm (0.31 in). Flesh is sweet, crisp.	Eating, cooking, cider	Use November–February
Reinette Burchardt see Burchardt's Reinette
Reinette Coulon		Belgium	1856	Width 77–95 mm, height 61–80 mm. Stalk 25 mm. Flesh yellowish-white, fine grained, firm, crisp, juicy, aromatic, subacid. TRIPLOID. Parentage Dutch Mignonne x ? Cold storage 3 °C 150 days.	Eating, cooking	Pick late October. Use December - March.
Reinette de Carmes (a.k.a. Reinette des Carmes, Karmeliter Renette)		France	<1700	A yellow apple striped with red. Width 69–74 mm., height 53–70 mm. Stalk 17 mm. Flesh: juicy, subacid.	Eating	Pick October. Use December–March.
Reinette de Caux (see Dutch Mignonne)
Reinette de Champagne		France	1770	A green apple. Width 66–79 mm (2.6–3.1 in), height 48–58 mm (1.9–2.3 in). Stalk 16 mm (0.63 in). Flesh is crisp, juicy, acid. Cold storage 3 °C 180 days. VitC 12. Density 0.84	Cooking, eating	PickG late October. Pickg October 23–30. Use February–May
Reinette de Cuzy		France	<1863	A yellow or green apple with russet and some red flush. Width 75 mm (3.0 in), height 60 mm (2.4 in). Stalk 8 mm (0.31 in).		Use December–May.
Reinette de Damason (see Reinette de Mâcon)
Reinette de Dietz see Dietzer Gold-Reinette
Reinette de France		Belgium of France	<1858	A flat-round green apple with red overcolor and much russet. Flesh yellowish-white, crisp, juicy, subacid, slightly aromatic. Triploid. Parentage Court pendu plat x ? Very popular in France. Flowering very late.	Eating	Pick October Use November - March.
Reinette de Geer		Belgium	1815	Width 64–72 mm, height 50–56 mm. Stalk 12 mm. Flesh yellowish, fine grained, crisp, juicy, subacid, aromatic.	Eating	Pick early October. Use November - February
Reinette de Mâcon (de. Damason Reinette, Reinette von Damason, fr. Reinette de Damason, Reinette de Maçon, ru. Renet Damason)		Mâcon, France	<1628	A flat-round apple with red overcolor and much russet. Width 77 mm, height 62 mm. Stalk 12–15 mm. Flesh dry, subacid. Triploid.	Eating, juice, cider	PickE early October. Use December–March.
Reinette de Metz		France	<1948	Width 68–75 mm, height 55–60 mm. Stalk 16 mm. Flesh cream, firm, rich, sweet.	Eating	PickE early October. Use November–December.
Reinette de Montmorency			<1800	A yellow apple with red flush. Width 70 mm (2.8 in), height 56 mm (2.2 in). Stalk 13 mm (0.51 in). Flesh is juicy, sweet.	Cooking, eating	Use January–May
Reinnete Diel		Belgium	<1801	A beautiful dessert apple of first quality. Width 50 mm (2.0 in), height 56 mm (2.2 in). The tree is a healthy and vigorous grower.	Eating	Use December–March
Reinette Dippedalle		France	<1850	Green with red flush. Width 57 mm (2.2 in), height 45 mm (1.8 in). Stalk 10 mm (0.39 in).	Cooking, eating	Use December–April
Reinette Dorée (a.k.a. Französische Goldrennte, Geele Renet, Geele Fransche Renet, Reinette de Lorraine, Reinette Tulipe)		France	<1780	Width 65–80 mm, height 55–65 mm. Stalk 10–22 mm. Flesh aromatic, subacid.	Eating	Use December - April
Reinette d'Orleans see Orleans Reinette
Reinette d'Osnabruck see Osnabrücker Reinette
Reinette du Canada (cs. Kanadská reneta, de. Kanada Reinette, Pariser Rambour Reinette, ru. Renet Kanadskii)		Normandy, France	<1771	Despite its name, it is an old French cultivar of domesticated apple. It is a reinette type of golden apple, with much russeting, which keeps shape in cooking. AM from RHS in 1901. If stored for some time it gets softer and is good to eat. Width 90–100 mm (3.5–3.9 in), height 70–80 mm (2.8–3.1 in), weight 170 g (6.0 oz). Triploid. Flesh is crisp, subacid, juicy. Cold storage 4 °C 150 days. VitC 17. Density 0.80	Eating, cooking, baking, juice	Use December–March
Reinette Franche		France	c. 1510	A dessert apple of first-rate quality. Width 70–85 mm (2.8–3.3 in), height 62–77 mm (2.4–3.0 in). Stalk 11–20 mm (0.43–0.79 in). Flesh yellowish-white, firm. The tree is a free grower, but subject to canker. This cultivar is in the genetic pedigree of around 18% of all apple cultivars. 2	Eating	Use November–April
Reinette Grise (cs. Kožená reneta zimní, de. Graue französische Reinette, fr. Reinette grise, ru. Renet serîi, Renet serîi franțuzskii, sv. Allmän grå renett, Läderrenett)		France	<1800	A very fine dessert apple. Width 76 mm (3.0 in), height 56–63 mm (2.2–2.5 in). The tree is a healthy and vigororus grower, and an excellent bearer. Flesh is greenish-white, juicy, subacid.	Eating, juice, drying	Use November–May
Reinette Grise d'Automne (a.k.a. Graue Herbstrenette, cs. Kožená reneta podzimní)		France or Holland	<1670	A greenish-yellow apple with russet. Width 65–85 mm (2.6–3.3 in), height 50–75 mm (2.0–3.0 in). C 18. Flesh is greenish-white, juicy, subacid.	Eating, juice, drying	Use October–January.
Reinette grise (de. Saintonge)				A green apple with russet. Width 83 mm (3.3 in), height 75 mm (3.0 in). Stalk 16 mm (0.63 in).		Use January–April
Reinette Harbert see Harbert's Reinette
Reinette Middelburg(a.k.a. Reinette von Middelburg)		Netherlands	<1819	Yellow conical. Width 56–65 mm (2.2–2.6 in), height 52–62 mm (2.0–2.4 in). Stalk 10 mm (0.39 in).	Cooking, eating	Use December–April
Reinette Oberdieck (ru. Renet Oberdika)		Germany ?	<1865	Width 70 mm, height 60 mm. Stalk 12–20 mm. Flesh yellowish, juicy, aromatic, subacid.	Eating	Use December - April.
Reinette Rouge Etoilée (a.k.a. Reinette Etoilée, Rothe Stern-Reinette, nl. Sterappel)		Belgium or Netherlands	1830	Round red apple. No ribs. Width 62 mm (2.4 in), height 56 mm (2.2 in). Stalk is short and stout. Flesh is white, dry, subacid. VitC 3–14. Density 0.83	Eating	Use October–December
Reinette Russet			Selected 1979	Bud mutation of 'Reine des Reinettes'. Width 63–76 mm (2.5–3.0 in), height 52–62 mm (2.0–2.4 in). Weight 117–204 g (4.1–7.2 oz). SS 14.9%, TA 1%. Flowering the same as 'Reine des Reinettes', flesh is greenish-white and turn browns quickly after cutting. very juicy,	processing, cider	fruit maturity is around the 1st two weeks Oct. in Quebec and 2 wks after ‘McIntosh'.
Reinette Simerenko (see Wood's Greening)
Reinette Weidner see Weidner's Goldreinette
Reinette von Wormsley (a.k.a. Reinette de Wormsley, Wormsley Pippin)		England	<1811	Width 80–84 mm, height 63–72 mm. Stalk short. Flesh yellowish-white, tender, crisp, rich, brisk, aromatic. juicy, subacid. Cells roundish ovate, axile.	Eating, cooking	Use September - October.
Reka		Dresden-Pillnitz, Germany	1984, introduced 1993	A green apple with red flush.	Eating	Pick September; use September–October
Relinda		Dresden-Pillnitz, Germany	1993	A scab resistant red apple. P Undine x F3.	Eating, cooking	Pick October; use December–March
Remo		Dresden-Pillnitz, Germany	Introduced 1990	A green apple with red overcolor (50–100%). Resistant to powdery mildew, scab and fire blight. Sugar 12.9%. TA 1.58%.	Juice	Pick September. Use September–October.
Renown		Welford Park, Berkshire, England	<1908	A conical uneven apple, covered with red flush. P Peasgood Nonsuch x Cox Orange. AM from RHS in 1908. Flesh is pale yellow firm, good. Raised by Charles Ross.	Cooking, eating	PickE late September.
Rescue		Saskatchewan, Canada	Introduced 1933	P Blushed Calville x unknown.	Eating	Pick late August
Retina		Dresden-Pillnitz, Germany	1991	A yellow apple with red flush. P Apollo x F3. Resistant to scab.	Eating, cooking	Pick September; use October
Rev. W. Wilks		Slough, Buckinghamshire, England	1904, introduced 1908	P Peasgood's Nonsuch x Ribston Pippin. Pastel green with a light pink flush. Very disease-resistant. Width 89 mm (3.5 in), height 76 mm (3.0 in). Stalk 10–16 mm (0.39–0.63 in). Cooks to a light, pale puree, hardly needing any sugar. AM from RHS in 1904. FCC from RHS in 1910. Nearly resistant to apple scab and apple canker.	Cooking	Pick early September; use September–November
Rewena		Dresden-Pillnitz, Germany	1991	A green apple with purple overcolour (up to 80%). Resistant to scab, powdery mildew and fire-blight. P BV 67,47 x F3	Eating, cooking	Pick August; use September
Rheinisher Krummstiel		Germany	<1828	A yellow apple, striped with red. Width 65–75 mm (2.6–3.0 in), height 60–75 mm (2.4–3.0 in). C 5. Stalk 7 mm (0.28 in). Flesh is yellowish-white, crisp juicy, subacid.	Cooking, eating, juice	PickG late October. Use December–April.
Rheinische Schafsnase		Germany	<1886	Width 71–84 mm (2.8–3.3 in), height 64–83 mm (2.5–3.3 in). Stalk 9–15 mm (0.35–0.59 in). Flesh is juicy, sweet.	Cooking	Use December–February
Rheinischer Winterrambour (a.k.a. Winterrambour)		Germany	<1650	A large apple. Flesh is greenish-white, juicy, sweet. VitC 15. TRI	Eating, cooking	PickG early October. Use December–March.
Rhode Island Greening (a.k.a. Burlington Greening, Russine, Bell Dubois, Jersey Greening, fr. Verte de Rhode-Island)		Newport, Rhode Island, US	1650s	Extremely old variety for United States, second only to Roxbury Russet in age. Width 81–93 mm (3.2–3.7 in), height 65–74 mm (2.6–2.9 in). Stalk 16–24 mm (0.63–0.94 in). Cells obovate, axile. Grass-green colour with some possible russeting near stem. Bred to keep over winter; will store well. Occasional reddish pink blush. Flesh is yellow, firm, crisp, tender, juicy, subacid, very good. Excellent choice for pies and strudels when used for baking.	Cider, cooking	Use November–February
Ribston Pippin (a.k.a. Formosa Pippin, Glory of York, Travers Pippin) agm		Knaresborough, North Yorkshire, England	1708	An irregularly-shaped and sometimes lopsided apple, usually round to conical and flattened at the base with distinct ribbing. Width 70–78 mm (2.8–3.1 in), height 58–62 mm (2.3–2.4 in). Stalk 7–10 mm (0.28–0.39 in). Cells obovate, axile. Skin is yellow with an orange blush and red streaked with russet dots. Yellow flesh is firm, fine-grained, crisp, juicy, aromatic and with a pear-like flavour, subacid, very good. The original Ribston Pippin sprouted in 1708 from one of three apple pips sent from Normandy to Sir Henry Goodricke, 4th Baronet of Ribston Hall at Knaresborough. P Margil x Nonsuch Park. The original tree stood until 1835. It then sent up a new shoot and, on the original roots, lived until 1928.Cold storage 0 °C 180 days. VitC 31. TRI	Eating	Pick early October. PickG mid–late September. Use November–January
Richard's Graft (a.k.a. Red Spitzenberg, Strawberry, Derrikinan)		New York, US	<1852	Width 75 mm (3.0 in), height 59 mm (2.3 in). Stalk 20 mm (0.79 in). Biennial. Flesh is yellowish-white, tender, juicy, aromatic, subacid, very good. Tree is medium-sized.	Eating	Use September–October
Richared Delicious		Washington	Selected 1915. Introduced 1926	Mutation of Delicious. Trademarked by Columbia and Okanogan Nursery Company, Washington.	Eating	
Ridge		US	<1850	A large apple. Flesh is yellowish, juicy, crisp, sweet, aromatic. Tree is a good grower and bearer.	Eating	Use March–April
Ringstad		Sweden	c. 1800	A yellow apple with red overcolour. Width 73 mm (2.9 in), height 60 mm (2.4 in).	Eating	Pick September; use October–November
Risäter		Sweden	c. 1800	A yellow apple. Width 68 mm (2.7 in), height 58 mm (2.3 in). Flesh is subacid.	Eating, cooking, cider	Pick September; use October–November
Rival		Berkshire, England	1900	Round, flattened and somewhat uneven-shaped apple. A fairly good cropper, keeping well into December. Raised by Charles Ross. AM from RHS in 1900. Width 73–81 mm (2.9–3.2 in), height 58–64 mm (2.3–2.5 in). Stalk 10–15 mm (0.39–0.59 in).	Eating, cooking	Pick late September–early October; use October–December
Rivers' Early Peach		Sawbridgeworth, Hertfordshire, England	Introduced 1893	A yellow flat conical apple. Width 88 mm (3.5 in), height 70 mm (2.8 in). Flesh is white, sweet, aromatic, dry. Stalk is short. Raised by Rivers Nursery.	Eating	Pick early to mid-August. Use August.
Rivers' Nonsuch		Sawbridgeworth, Hertfordshire, England	<1875	A yellow apple with red stripes. Width 63–73 mm, height 47–53 mm. Stalk 25 mm. Raised by Rivers Nursery.	Eating	Pick mid September. Use September–October.
Rockit		New Zealand	Introduced to US 2011	A miniature red and yellow apple. Width 30–50 mm (1.2–2.0 in). Flesh is firm, juicy, sweet.	Eating	Use August–October.
Rock Pippin (a.k.a. Ridge Pippin, Lemon)		US	<1850	Width 75 mm (3.0 in), height 75 mm (3.0 in). Stalk 15 mm (0.59 in). Flesh is yellow, dry, acid.	Cooking	Use December–March
Rokewood		Australia	<1900	Skin yellow, almost completely covered with deep red blush. Width 56 mm, height 50 mm. Stalk 18 mm. Tree is a vigorous grower and regular and heavy bearer. One of the very best keeping apples. Not suited for England.	Eating	Ripens March–April in Australia.
Rolfe		Maine, US	<1857	Stalk is short- to medium-length. Flesh is whitish, tender, juicy, sweet.	Eating	Use August–September
Roman Stem		New Jersey, US	<1800	Flesh is juicy, aromatic, subacid, very good.	Eating	Use October–December
Rome Beauty (cs. Římské krásné, de. Morgenduft, fr. Belle de Rome, ru. Rimskaia krasavița)		Rome, Ohio, United States	Introduced 1848	Rounded, deep red, and very glossy. Width 72–86 mm (2.8–3.4 in), height 66–74 mm (2.6–2.9 in). Stalk 28 mm (1.1 in). Flesh is yellow, firm, crisp, juicy, aromatic, mild subacid, good. Develops an extraordinary depth and richness when cooked. DBH 162–175.	Cooking, eating	Pick 45 October 15. Pick55 September 25. Use November–May
Ronk		Indiana, US	1860	An apple of the Vandevere type.	Eating	Use October–January
Roode Tulpappel				A yellow conical apple, striped and flushed with red. Width 59 mm (2.3 in), height 64 mm (2.5 in). Stalk 7 mm (0.28 in).		Pick early August. Use early August.
Rosemary Russet agm		United Kingdom	First recorded 1831	Flat conical, yellow with brick red flush, flesh crisp, yellow. Regular cropper. Flesh is creamy white, fine-textured, juicy, sweet, sharp, like 'Ashmead's Kernel'. Width 64–70 mm (2.5–2.8 in), height 55–60 mm (2.2–2.4 in). Stalk 24–28 mm (0.94–1.10 in).	Eating	Pick late September; use November–March
Rosenhæger Danish		Denmark	<1795	A green apple with red overcolour. Width 53–60 mm (2.1–2.4 in), height 48–55 mm (1.9–2.2 in).	Eating	Use October–November
Rosenhäger Swedish		Sweden	<1800	A yellow apple with red overcolour. Width 68 mm (2.7 in), height 50 mm (2.0 in).	Eating	Use November–December
Ross Nonpareil		Ireland	<1802, introduced to England 1819	Small, round, even, covered russet with dark crimson markings. Flesh is white, firm, soft, rich aromatic, nonpariel flavour.	Eating	Picke late September. Use November–January
Roter Ananas		Sieglitzerberg, Germany	1854	A red conical apple. Width 58 mm (2.3 in), height 56 mm (2.2 in). Stalk 20 mm (0.79 in).	Cooking, eating	Pick September; use September–October
Roter Eiserapfel		Europe	<1700	A green apple with red flush. Width 75–80 mm (3.0–3.1 in), height 68–75 mm (2.7–3.0 in). Stalk 5–15 mm (0.20–0.59 in). Flesh is greenish-white, subacid, very hard. Quality: cooking good, juice good. Cold storage 2 °C 120 days.	Cooking, juice	PickG mid-October. Use December–July
Roter Stettiner (cs. Vejlímek červený, Štětínské, de. Roter Winterstettiner, fr. Rouge de Stettin)		Germany or Poland	<1800	Greenish-yellow with red flush. Width 75 mm (3.0 in), height 55 mm (2.2 in). Stalk 11–15 mm (0.43–0.59 in). Flesh is yellowish-white, juicy, subacid. TRI	Cooking, drying, juice	Pick October; use January–June
Roter Trierer Weinapfel		Germany	<1880	A red apple for juice and cider. Width 55 mm (2.2 in), height 47 mm (1.9 in). Stalk 15–18 mm (0.59–0.71 in). Flesh is white to yellow-green, crisp, acid, juicy.	Juice, cider	PickG late October; use November–March
Rote Sternrenette (see Reinette Rouge Etoilee)
Rother Jungfernapfel (a.k.a. Roter Böhmischer Jungfernapfel, cs. Panenské české, ru. Krasnîi petușok)		Bohemia, Germany	<1800	A small apple. Width 49 mm (1.9 in), height 46 mm (1.8 in). Stalk 20 mm (0.79 in). Flesh is yellowish-white, juicy.	Eating, cooking	Use November–January
Rother Winterhimbeerapfel (a.k.a. Oberländer Winterhimbeerapfel, Zigeunerapfel)		Hungary	<1850	A red apple. Width 66 mm (2.6 in), height 55 mm (2.2 in). Flesh is juicy, aromatic.	Eating	Pick October; use November–March
Roundway Magnum Bonum		Roundway Park, Devizes, Wiltshire, England	<1864	Very large apple. Width 82 mm (3.2 in), height 76 mm (3.0 in). Stalk is short to medium. A first-rate culinary or desert apple. Flesh is greenish-yellow, dry, sweet pear-like flavour.	Eating, cooking	
Rouville		Canada	Cross made 1962, selected 1972, introduced 1983	A greenish-yellow apple with 75% red overcolor. Width 70–80 mm. Flesh white to reamy, juicy, subacid, fair to good. Tree vigorous.	Eating, Cooking, Juice.	
Roxbury Russet (a.k.a. Boston Russet, Putnam Russet, Warner Russet, Sylvan Russet, Belpre Russet, Marietta Russet, Howe's Russet)		Massachusetts, United States	c. 1640	First tree was a chance seedling grown in Roxbury, Massachusetts, now a neighborhood of Boston. Oldest known variety of apple in America, planted by Pilgrim Fathers as foundation stock for Massachusetts Bay Colony. Knobbly, russetted coat gives green skin a bronze tinge. Flesh cream coloured flesh, firme, coarse, tender, juicy, subacid good to very good. Width 70–89 mm (2.8–3.5 in), height 57–76 mm (2.2–3.0 in), stalk 12–26 mm (0.47–1.02 in). Excellent keeper; resistant to fireblight. Mild flavour. Multi-purpose apple that is a wonderful choice for pies, eating fresh, or cider. Still available in New England farmer's markets; commercial interest recently renewed in this cultivar because of its past use as a cider apple.	Cooking (pies), eating, cider	Use January–June
Royal Gala		Matamata, New Zealand	Discovered 1971, introduced 1974	Mutation of Gala. Flesh is yellow, firm, crisp, juicy.	Eating	Ripens before McIntosh. In Missouri, late August.
Ros Picant		Romania	19th century	Characterized by its distinct, faintly spicy flavor. Green and yellow, mostly used for making cider and Pálinka.	Cider, cooking, eating	
Royal Jubilee (Graham's, cs. Grahamovo, de. Graham, Grahams Jubiläumsapfel, ru. Graima iubileinoe, Zolotoe Graima, Graama iubileinoe.)		Middlesex, England	1888, introduced 1893	Large yellow conical cooking apple. Width 65–90 mm (2.6–3.5 in), height 54–90 mm (2.1–3.5 in), weight 130–190 g (4.6–6.7 oz). Raised by John Graham of Hounslow. Stalk 10 mm (0.39 in). Tree is very dwarfed. Flesh is yellow, firm, subacid. Free from canker. VitC 5.	Cooking, juice	PickG mid-September; use October–December
Royal Late		England	<1896	A large yellow-green apple with russet. Am from RHS in 1896. Flesh is soft, yellow, juicy, subacid. Very liable to canker.	Cooking	
Royal Russet		England	1597	A most excellent culinary apple of first rate quality. Width 88 mm (3.5 in), height 69 mm (2.7 in).	Cooking	Use November–May
Rozela		Czech Republic	2008	Flesh is medium firm, juicy with great aromatic flavour and delicate smell. The skin is attractive bright red with prominent lenticels. Annual producer of heavy crops, the resistant equivalent of Idared with outstanding flavour.	Eating	
Rubens (Civni)		Ferrara, Italy	1985	A greenish-yellow apple with red to orange-red overcolor (60–100%). P Elstar x Gala. Flesh is creamy-white, firm, juicy, sweet, aromatic.	Eating	Pick 10 days after Gala.
Rubinette (a.k.a. Rafzubin)		Rafs, Switzerland	1966, Introduced 1982	A yellow apple with red flush. P Golden Delicious x unknown. Flesh; juicy, aromatic, subacid. Cold storage 2-4 °C 120 days.	Eating	PickG early–mid-October. Pickg October 1–10. Use October–December
Rubinola		Czech Republic		Parentage Prima x Rubin	Eating, Juice	
Rubinstar		Gaiberg, Germany	1980	Bud mutation of Jonagold. 70-90% red overcolor.		
Rubisgold		Sint-Truiden, Belgium	2013	Parentage Rubinstep x Delblush	Eating	ripens with Golden Delicious
Ruddy				A round apple covered with red flush. Flesh is sweet, slightly aromatic. P Ecklinville x Mere de Menage. Raised by Charles Ross.		
Rushock Pearmain		Worcestershire England	1821	An apple of first-rate qualtity, almost entirely covered with russet. Width 63 mm (2.5 in), height 57 mm (2.2 in).	Eating	Use Christmas–April
Rutledge		Possibly Texas, US	<1892	Tree is vigorous. Flesh is tender, juicy, subacid, sweet, fair to good.	Eating	Use January–May

=== S ===
Common name	Image	Origin	First developed	Comment	Use	Pick/Use period
Sack and Sugar		England	c. 1820	A yellow apple. Stalk is very short. Cells ovate, axile. Flesh is tender, juicy, aromatic, good.	Cooking, eating	Pick September
Saint Cecila		Wales	1900	Even oval, golden yellow with crimson flush and stripes. Width 73 mm (2.9 in), height 60 mm (2.4 in). FCC from RHS in 1919.	Eating	Pick early October; use December–March
Saint Clair		Illinois, US	Seed planted 1913 or 1914. Introduced 1935 or 1947	Resembles Wealthy. Tree is strong, productive.	Eating	
Saint Edmund's Pippinagm		Bury, St. Edmunds Suffolk, England	1870s	Width 63 mm (2.5 in), height 52 mm (2.0 in). Stalk 12–22 mm (0.47–0.87 in). Cells ovate, axile. Unusual in the fact that it has scaly russet patches mixed with smooth. Raised by Mr. Harvey. One of the best early russets. Flesh is yellow, very juicy, vanilla/pear taste. Usually a light yellow-green.	Eating	Pick mid-September; use September–October
Saint Everard		Papwoth Everard, near Cambridge, Cambridgeshire, England	1900, introduced 1910	Yellow striped with crimson. Width 57 mm (2.2 in), height 45 mm (1.8 in). FCC from RHS in 1919. Flesh is crisp, yellow, juicy, excellent.	Eating	Pick early September; use September
Saint German see Virginischer Rosenapfel
Saint Lawrence(fr. Saint-Laurent)			<1831	Width 60 mm, height 48 mm. Stalk 20mm. Flesh is tender, juicy, aromatic, subacid.	Eating	Use September–October
Saint Martins		Hertfordshire, England	<1896	Brownish red with russet. Width 54 mm, height 50 mm. Sweet flavoured with a hint of lemons.. AM from RHS in 1896. P Bess Pool x Cox Orange.	Eating	PickE late October. Use October - December
Salome		Illinois, US	c. 1853	Yellow with red flush, round oblate. Width 74 mm (2.9 in), height 64 mm (2.5 in). Stalk 16 mm (0.63 in). Tree is vigorous, large. Flesh is yellow firm, crisp, tender, juicy, subacid, good to very good.	Eating	Use November–March
Saltcote Pippin		England	<1918	Good flavour reminding one of Mother. Award of Merit from RHS in 1928. Width 74 mm (2.9 in), height 61 mm (2.4 in). Stalk is short or medium-length. Flesh is juicy, sweet, aromatic.	Eating	Pick early October; use November–January
Samo		Finland	Introduced 1981	A greenish-yellow apple. P Melba x Huvitus. Flesh is sweet, subacid.	Eating	Pick September
Sandra		Finland	Introduced 1996	A red Apple. P Lobo x Huvitus. Flesh is sweet, subacid.	Eating	Pick mid-September
Sandringham		Norfolk, England	Introduced 1884	A yellow apple. FCC from RHS in 1883. P Woodford x King of the Pippins. Flesh is yellowish, firm, soft, subacid.	Cooking	
Sanspareil		England	<1899	Medium to large, even round apple. Yellow red stripes. First Class Certificate from RHS in 1899.	Cooking, eating	Use February–May
Santana		Wageningen, Netherlands	1978	Scab resistant. Parentage Elstar x Priscilla.	Eating	
Särsö (a.k.a. Mignon, Cloetta)		Sweden	<1917	Width 73 mm (2.9 in), height 60 mm (2.4 in). Stalk 25 mm (0.98 in). Flesh is subacid, fair to good.	Eating, cooking, jam	Pick late September; use October–November
Saturn		Kent, England	1980	Parentage Falstaff x Cox Orange Pippin. Scab resistant. Flesh sweet.	Eating	PickE September. Use October - December.
Scarlet Cranberry		Virginia, US	<1865	Flesh is crisp, juicy, astringent, subacid, fair to good.	Eating	
Scarlet Nonpareil (fr. Non-pareille Écarlate)		Surrey, England	1773	A very excellent dessert apple of first-rate quality. AM from RHS in 1901. Flesh is pale yellow, sweet, firm, good. Width 57 mm (2.2 in), height 52 mm (2.0 in).	Eating	Use January–March
Scarlet O'Hara		New Jersey, US	Cross made 1971, selected 1978, introduced 2000.	A yellow apple with red flush. Diameter 70–76 mm (2.8–3.0 in). Stalk 28–33 mm (1.1–1.3 in). Flesh is yellow, firm, very crisp, subacid.	Eating	Pick one week beforde Delicious.
Scarlet Pearmain (de. Scharlachrote Parmäne, fr. Écarlate d'été, ru. Parmen krasnîi, Șafran krasnîi.)		Middlesex, England	c. 1800	A dessert apple of first rate quality. The tree is a free and vigorous grower. Flesh is yellow, tender. Width 60–65 mm (2.4–2.6 in), height 54–60 mm (2.1–2.4 in). Weight 95-100 gram. Cells obovate, axile.	Eating	Use October–January
Scarlet Pippin		Ontario	<1895	Stalk short. Flesh is white, juicy, subacid.	Eating	Use September–October
Scarlet Staymared		Washington, US	Introduced 1936	A red apple.	Cooking	
Scarlet Tiffing		England	<1875	A valuable and excellent culinary apple. Width 76 mm (3.0 in), height 57 mm (2.2 in). Stalk 12 mm (0.47 in).	Cooking	Use November–December
Schellinkhout		Netherlands	1885	A yellow conical apple with red stripes (0–20%). Width 81 mm (3.2 in), height 72 mm (2.8 in). Stalk 18 mm (0.71 in).	Eating	Use October–November
Schmidberger		Austria	<1873	Width 70 mm, height 60 mm. Stalk 16 mm. Flesh white, firm, aromatic, subacid.	Eating, Juice	Use December - March
Schoolmaster		Lincolnshire, England	1855, introduced 1882	A fine cooking apple. FCC from RHS in 1880. Width 76 mm (3.0 in), height 70 mm (2.8 in). Stalk is very short. Cells obovate, axile. P Golden Noble x Dumelow. Flesh is white, crisp, acid.	Cooking	PickE mid-October. Use November –January.
Scrumptious agm		Kent, England	2003	Sweet and crisp. Self-fertile, mid-season variety that ripens in early September and will store well for about a month. The blossom is frost hardy resulting in heavy crops and the tree can be grown in all areas of the UK. The flesh is crisp and aromatic, and the thin skin turns a deep red as it develops.	Eating	
Scweizer Orange		Switzerland	Raised 1935, introduced 1954	A green-yellow apple with red orange flush. Width 67 mm (2.6 in), height 50 mm (2.0 in), weight 105 g (3.7 oz). Cold storage 2 °C 150 days.	Eating, cooking	PickE mid-October.
Secor		Iowa, US	Introduced 1922	P Salome x Jonathan. Free from Jonathan spot in storage.	Eating	Use January–April
SeeandO Red Rome 262		Washington, US	Introduced 1943	Mutation of Rome Beauty.	Eating	
Seneca Favorite		US	<1853	Stalk is long to medium. Flesh is crisp, tender juicy, subacid, very good.	Eating, cooking.	Pick September. Use September–December.
September Beauty		Bedfordshire, England	1885	Width 70 mm (2.8 in), height 57 mm (2.2 in). FCC from RHS in 1885. A yellowish-green apple, striped with orange. Flesh is yellow, tender. Skin is slightly russetted.	Eating	Pick mid-September. Use September–November.
Serinka		Lithuania	<1852	Width 68 mm, height 58 mm. Stalk 12 mm. Flesh aromatic, subacid.	Eating	Pick September. Use September.
Shackleford		Missouri, US	<1883	Width 83 mm (3.3 in), height 69 mm (2.7 in). Stalk 16 mm (0.63 in). Flesh is firm, crisp, tender, juicy, subacid, fair to good.	Eating	Use November–April
Shampion (see Champion)
Sharp		Illinois, US	<1889	Width 65 mm (2.6 in), height 48 mm (1.9 in). Stalk 10 mm (0.39 in). Flesh is tender, crisp juicy, sweet, very good.	Eating	Use October–November
Sharon		Iowa, US	Introduced 1922	A red striped fruit. P McIntosh x Longfield. Tree is vigorous, productive, hardy.	Eating	
Shinano Sweet		Nagano, Japan	1978	Mid-season crops. Tsugaru x Fuji	Eating	
Shiawasse (a.k.a. Shiawasse Beauty)		Michigan, US	Introduced 1862	Width 81 mm (3.2 in), height 54 mm (2.1 in). Stalk 10 mm (0.39 in). Flesh is white, subacid, aromatic.	Eating	Use October–January
Shockley		Jackson County, Georgia, United States	1852	Width 64 mm (2.5 in), height 59 mm (2.3 in). Stalk 22 mm (0.87 in). Yellowish and green skin with reddish stripes. Flesh is crisp, juicy, sweet taste with vinous flavour. Tree moderately vigorous.	Eating, preserves	Use February–May
Shoesmith		Surrey, England	<1930	P Lane's Prince Albert x Golden Noble. Width 93 mm (3.7 in), height 76 mm (3.0 in). Stalk is medium to long. Flesh is white, soft, juicy, subacid.	Cooking	Pick late September. Use September–December.
Shotwell Delicious		Washington, US	1928	Mutation of Delicious	Eating	
Siely's Mignonne		England	c. 1800	Yellow covered with russet. Width 45 mm (1.8 in), height 45 mm (1.8 in). Stalk 13 mm (0.51 in). Flesh is greenish yellow. Juice is highly aromatic and of most excellent flavour.	Eating, juice	Use November–February
Signe Tillisch(ru. Sini Tilliş)		Denmark	1866	A yellow apple with red flush. Width 70–90 mm (2.8–3.5 in), height 55–80 mm (2.2–3.1 in), weight 95–200 g (3.4–7.1 oz). Parentage Alexander x London Pippin. Cold Storage 1 °C 60 days. VitC 7.	Eating, cooking	Use September–October
Sirius		Czech Republic	2007	Flesh is yellow, firm, crisp, finely-grained, very juicy, well balanced sugar and acid level, with a rich flavour	Eating	
Sir John Thornycroft		United Kingdom	<1911	Above medium size, shing yellow with pinkish red flush on sunny side. AGM from RHS in 1911.	Eating	Use October–March
Sir Prize (a.k.a. Co-op 5)		US	First fruited 1961, Introduced 1975	A yellow apple with a waxy finish. Width 76–83 mm (3.0–3.3 in), height 76–83 mm (3.0–3.3 in). Flesh is yellow to white, tender, juicy, subacid.	Eating	Pick55 September 20. PickG early October. Use October–December.
Sir William Gibbon's		England	<1880	A calville-shaped excellent culinary apple. Width 96 mm (3.8 in), height 76 mm (3.0 in). Stalk is very short.	Cooking	Use November–January
Sitchamton Russet		England	<1876	A dessert apple of good quality. Skin covered with grey russet. Width 60 mm (2.4 in), height 51 mm (2.0 in). Stalk is short and stout. Flesh is yellowish, juicy, aromatic flavour.	Eating	Use December–February
Sköldinge		Sweden	c. 1800	Width 65 mm (2.6 in), height 61 mm (2.4 in). Stalk 15 mm (0.59 in). Flesh is juicy, sweet, subacid, good.	Eating	Pick early October. Use November–January.
Slack-Ma-Girdle		Devonshire, England	<1880	Yellow streaked with red. Width 62 mm (2.4 in), height 47 mm (1.9 in). Stalk is very short.	Cider	Pick mid-October. Use October–December.
Slastica		Croatia		Yellow with red flush. Width 50–60 mm (2.0–2.4 in), height 40–60 mm (1.6–2.4 in), weight 70–100 g (2.5–3.5 oz). Short is stalk. Flesh is yellowish to white, firm, juicy, sweet. Disease resistant. Biennial.	Eating, cooking, cider, drying	Pick mid-October
Slatka šarenika (a.k.a. Šarenika)		Montenegro		Green with red flush. Width 71 mm (2.8 in), height 59 mm (2.3 in). Weight 149 g (5.3 oz). Stalk is medium-length. Flesh is juicy, sweet, aromatic.	Eating, cooking	Pick mid-October. Use November–May.
Slatka srčika (a.k.a. Srčika)		Croatia		A yellow apple with red flush. Width 65–75 mm (2.6–3.0 in), height 50–60 mm (2.0–2.4 in). Weight 100–150 g (3.5–5.3 oz). Stalk is short. Flesh is juicy, sweet, subacid.	Eating, cooking, cider, drying.	Pick mid-October
Sleeping Beauty		Lincolnshire, England	1851	Medium-sized. A most excellent apple for all culinary purposes, and particularly for sauce.	Cooking	Use November–February
Slor		Israel	Introduced 1982	Large conic, dark red stripes. Flesh is sweet, subacid.	Eating	
Small's Admirable		Lincolnshire or Buckinghamshire, England	c. 1850	Width 72 mm, height 58 mm. Stalk 20 mm. An excellent kitchen and dessert apple. Cells obovate, axile. Flesh is white, firm, crisp, juicy, subacid.	Cooking, eating	PickE mid-October. Use November–December.
Smaragd		Novi Sad, Serbia	Cross made 1992, selected 1999.	A green apple with no overcolor. P Granny Smith x McIntosh Wijcik. Width 74 mm (2.9 in), height 68 mm (2.7 in). Weight 175 g (6.2 oz). Stalk 21 mm (0.83 in). Flesh is fine, crisp, juicy. SS 11.6, TA 1.03		
Smart's Prince Arthur		Kent, England	<1883	A yellow apple with purplish red stripes (50–100%). Width 74 mm (2.9 in), height 77 mm (3.0 in). Flesh is pale yellow, firm, dry, subacid.	Cooking	Pick late September–early October. Use November–April.
Smith's (a.k.a. Smith's cider, fr. Popular Bluff)		Pennsylvania, US	<1825	Width 70–83 mm (2.8–3.3 in), height 60–76 mm (2.4–3.0 in). Stalk 10–20 mm (0.39–0.79 in). Tree is very vigorous. Flesh is white, tender, juicy, crisp, subacid, good.	Cooking, cider	Use December–March
Smokehouse		Mill Creek, Pennsylvania, US	1837	Width 82–88 mm (3.2–3.5 in), height 64–68 mm (2.5–2.7 in). Stalk 19–23 mm (0.75–0.91 in). Greenish-yellow with flushed red-orange stripes. The yellowish-white flesh is crisp and tender with a spicy-sweet flavour that tastes like cider. Excellent all-purpose apple. Unusual in that it also makes excellent cider. Seedling discovered growing next to the smokehouse on William Gibbons' farm in Mill Creek, PA. Bears fruit from young age. Tree moderately vigorous.	Eating, cooking, cider	Pick45 September 10. Use September–February.
Snow apple see Fameuse
Snövit		Sweden	1936	Yellow with red flush. Width 64 mm (2.5 in), height 56 mm (2.2 in). P Stenbock x Pfirsichroter Sommerapfel.	Eating	Pick September. Use September.
Södermanlands kalvill		Sweden	<1850	Width 70–100 mm (2.8–3.9 in), height 61–86 mm (2.4–3.4 in). Stalk 17–18 mm (0.67–0.71 in). Flesh is juicy, aromatic, good.	Eating	Use October–December
Södermanlands äpple		Sweden	<1800	Width 65–83 mm (2.6–3.3 in), height 65–79 mm (2.6–3.1 in). Stalk 19–28 mm (0.75–1.10 in). Flesh is juicy, subacid, good.	Eating	Use September–December
Somerset		US	<1869	Tree is an early bearer. Flesh is white, juicy, aromatic, very good.	Eating	Use September–October
Sonya		New Zealand	2000	Cross between a Red Delicious and Gala. Coppery coloration. Crisp.	Eating	
Sops-in-Wine 1		Cornwall or Devonshire, England	<1688	Width 64–70 mm (2.5–2.8 in), height 53–70 mm (2.1–2.8 in). Stalk 13 mm (0.51 in). Strong ribbing. Tree is vigorous. Flesh is white-pinkish, tender, sweet.	Cooking, cider	Pick mid-October. Use October–February
Sops of Wine (a.k.a. Sops-in-wine 2)		US or UK	<1850	Flesh is yellow tinged with red. Juicy, subacid, good to very good. Width 71 mm (2.8 in), height 60 mm (2.4 in). Stalk 22 mm (0.87 in). Tree is vigorous, very hardy, an excellent bearer and not subject to canker.	Eating	Pick August. Use August–September.
Sowman's Seedling		Lancashire, England	Raised 1914. Introduced 1927	A large green apple. P Grenadier x Bismark. Very susceptible to Bitter Pit.	Cooking	Use August–September
Sparreholm		Sweden	1868	Width 77 mm (3.0 in), height 77 mm (3.0 in). Stalk 10 mm (0.39 in).	Eating	Pick September. Use September.
Spartan		British Columbia, Canada	Cross made 1926. Selected and introduced 1936.	Round-conical, yellow, 75–100% flushed crimson. Strong aroma. Prone to canker. Width 64 mm (2.5 in), height 56–58 mm (2.2–2.3 in). Stalk 15–20 mm (0.59–0.79 in). Good all-purpose, medium-sized apple. Has a bright red blush and may have background patches of greens and yellows. Popular across border in United States as well. Cold storage 1 °C 120 days.	Cooking, eating, cider	Pick45 September 16. Pick55 September 1. PickE early October. Use November–February.
Spencer		Summerland, British Columbia, Canada	Cross made 1926, selected 1938, introduced 1959	A yellow apple with red flush (50–75%). Width 71 mm (2.8 in), height 68 mm (2.7 in). Stalk is long. Flesh is creamy white, firm, crisp, juicy, sweet. Parentage: McIntosh x Golden Delicious.	Eating	PickE mid- to late October. Use October–January.
Spigold		Geneva, New York, US		A greenish yellow apple with purplish red flush (25–50%). Width 79 mm (3.1 in), height 72 mm (2.8 in). Stalk is long. Flesh is creamy white, juicy, sweet. TRI	Eating	PickE mid-October. Use November–February.
Splendour/Splendor		New Zealand	1948	Descendant of Red Dougherty x Golden Delicious, ancestor of Pacific Rose and Aurora Golden Gala	Eating	
Stanard (a.k.a. Stannard)		New York, US	<1850	Width 88 mm (3.5 in), height 72 mm (2.8 in). Stalk 14 mm (0.55 in). Flesh is yellowish-white, tender, very juicy, acid to subacid. Very good. Superior for cooking.	Eating, Cooking	Use November–February
Star		New York, US ?	<1850	A roundish oblate apple, splashed with crimson. Stalk short. Flesh, white, subacid.Good.	Eating	Use November
Stäringe Karin		Sweden	<1902	Width 77 mm (3.0 in), height 67 mm (2.6 in). Stalk 15 mm (0.59 in). A green apple with red flush. Flesh is juicy, subacid, good.	Eating	Pick late September
Star of Devon		Devonshire, England	Introduced 1905	Oblong-shaped yellow apple with red stripes. AM from RHS in 1905. Flesh is white, soft, poor. Width 64 mm (2.5 in), height 48 mm (1.9 in).	Eating	PickE early October. Use October–April.
Stark		Possibly Ohio, US	<1867	Width 92 mm (3.6 in), height 84 mm (3.3 in). Stalk 20 mm (0.79 in). Tree is vigorous, hardy, healthy. Flesh is yellow, firm, fine, tender, juicy, mild subacid, fair to good.	Eating, cooking	Use November–April
Stark Earliest		Idaho, US	1938. Introduced 1944.	Width 57–63 mm (2.2–2.5 in), height 45–60 mm (1.8–2.4 in). Stalk 18 mm (0.71 in). Does nicely in fruit salads. Red striping on light background. Cold storage 4 °C 20 days.	Eating	PickE early August. Use August–September.
Starkey		Maine, US	<1875	Stalk is medium-length. Flesh is white, juicy, crisp, subacid, very good.	Eating	Use October–January
Starr		New Jersey, US	<1870	Flesh is whitish, subacid. Good. Stalk is slender.	Cooking	Use July–September
Starking (a.k.a. Starking Delicious, Double Red Delicious ru. Prevoshodnoe dvoinoe)		Monroeville, New Jersey, USA	1921. Introduced 1924	A red mutation of Delicious. Width 60–80 mm (2.4–3.1 in), height 60–80 mm (2.4–3.1 in). Flesh is juicy, sweet. VitC 13. Density 0.82	Eating	Use December–March
Starkspur Golden Delicious		Yakima, Washington, US	Discovered 1959, introduced 1961	Mutation of Golden Delicious	Eating	
Stayman		US	1866	Dullish red skin often covered with a light russet. Width 78 mm (3.1 in), height 76 mm (3.0 in). Tart, wine-like flavour. Flesh is yellow, firm, coarse, tender, juicy, mild subacid, aromatic, good to very good. Stores well. Particularly known for tangy cider. Cold storage 1 °C 150 days. DBH 166–175.	Cider, cooking, eating	Pick45 October 7. Pick55 September 25. Use January–May. DBH 167.
Staymanred		Virginia, US	Discovered 1926. Introduced 1929	A red apple. Mutation of Stayman Winesap.		
Stenkyrke		Sweden	c. 1750	A yellow conical apple. Width 75 mm (3.0 in), height 60 mm (2.4 in). Flesh is juicy, subacid, very good.	Eating	Use November–January
Sterappel (see Reinette Rouge Etoilee)
Stina Lohmann		Kellinghusen, Holstein, Germany	c. 1800	A yellow apple striped with red. Width 65–80 mm (2.6–3.1 in), height 50–65 mm (2.0–2.6 in). C 17. Flesh is yellow-white, crisp, juicy, subacid. C 17.	Eating, cooking	Use January–May
Stirling		British Columbia, Canada.	Introduced 1936	P Yellow Newtown x unknown. Flesh is crisp, juicy. Short storage life.	Eating	
Stirling Castle		Stirlingshire, Scotland	<1831	Width 67–76 mm (2.6–3.0 in), height 54–60 mm (2.1–2.4 in). Stalk 18 mm (0.71 in). Cells wide open obovate, abaxile. Medium size, round, flattish, even apple. Flesh is white, juicy, acid very soft. Old trees canker badly.	Cooking	PickE mid-September. Use September–December.
Stoke Edith Pippin		Herefordshire, England	1872	An excellent dessert apple. Flesh is yellow firm, crisp, brisk and juicy, sweet, and with a perfumed flavour. Width 50 mm (2.0 in), height 50 mm (2.0 in).	Eating	Use November–February
Stolovača		Serbia	<1900	A green apple. Width 65–75 mm (2.6–3.0 in), height 45–55 mm (1.8–2.2 in). Weight 155–185 g (5.5–6.5 oz). Stalk is short. Flesh is white, subacid.	Eating, cooking	Pick late September–early October
Stonetosh		Canada	Introduced 1922	P Stone x McIntosh. Fleshbis soft, juicy, sweet, white. Triploid.	Eating	Pick early October. Use October–February.
Strand Winesap see Red Winesap
Streifling Herbst		Netherlands or Western Europe		Sour-sweet flavor. Popular in Eastern Europe	Eating, juice, jam, compote, drying	
Striped Beefing		Norfolk, England	Found 1794, introduced 1847.	One of the best culinary apples; for baking it is unrivalled. Width 90 mm (3.5 in), height 72 mm (2.8 in). Stalk 10 mm (0.39 in). Cells obovate, axile or abaxile.	Baking	PickE early October. Use November–February.
Strode's Birmingham (a.k.a. Strode's)		Pennsylvania, US	<1875	A small yellow apple. Flesh is yellow, juicy, subacid. Good to very good. Tree vigorous.	Eating	Use September.
Sturmer Pippin		Sturmer, Haverhill, Suffolk, England	<1831	A bright greenish-yellow apple with a reddish-brown blush, often on one face only. Width 69 mm (2.7 in), height 62 mm (2.4 in). Stalk 12–25 mm (0.47–0.98 in). Cells obovate, axile, closed. Flesh white, crisp, juicy, subacid, aromatic. One of the best English keeping apples, with proper storage Sturmer Pippin lasts 4 to 5 months. Flavour is sprightly, more sharp than sweet when first picked, but improves dramatically in storage, becoming sweeter and richer, while maintaining its crisp texture. This keeping ability made it ideal for long journeys, as such, it was brought to Australia where it is still widely grown. Parent of Granny Smith.	Eating	Pick mid-October. Use January–April.
Sugar Loaf Pippin				A green conical apple. Width 76 mm (3.0 in), height 85 mm (3.3 in). Stalk 12 mm (0.47 in). Cells elliptical, abaxile.		Pick early August.
Suislepper		Estonia	<1870	Flesh soft and aromatic. Width 70 mm (2.8 in), height 70 mm (2.8 in). VitC 22.	Eating	Pick September. Use September.
Šumatovka (a.k.a. Popadija)		Serbia	<1900	A yellow apple with red flush. Width 67 mm (2.6 in), height 57 mm (2.2 in). Weight 117 g (4.1 oz). Stalk 23 mm (0.91 in). Flesh white, firm, crisp, sweet, subacid. Tree extremely vigorous.	Eating, cooking	Pick October. Use November–January.
Summer Bellflower		New York, US	<1848	Flesh tender, subacid, good. P Esopus Spitzenburg x unknown.	Eating	
Summerfree		Italy	1998	Resistant to scab. Spreading habit with moderate vigour, fruit is large, average weight of 175 g (6.2 oz), skin is smooth, ripens 1–2 days before Gala, good storage ability.	Eating	
Summer Golden Pippin		England	<1800	A small apple, ripe in the end of August. Richer flavour than Yellow Ingestrie. Width 51 mm (2.0 in), height 54 mm (2.1 in). Cells obovate, axile, closed. Flesh yellowish, firm, very juicy, vinous and sugary flavour. The tree is a small grower. It is an early and abundant bearer.	Eating	PickE late August. Use within two weeks.
Summer Pearmain see Autumn Pearmain.
Summer Pearmain American (a.k.a. Early Summer Pearmain, American Summer Pearmain, Early Summer Pearmain)		US	<1817	Greenish yellow with red overcolour. Width 75 mm (3.0 in), height 68 mm (2.7 in). Stalk 23 mm (0.91 in). Flesh yellowish, juicy, aromatic, mild, subacid.	Eating	Use August–September.
Summer Pippin		Unknown origin, US, probably New York.	<1800	Flesh white, tender, moderately juicy, subacid. Width 78 mm (3.1 in), height 70 mm (2.8 in). Stalk variable. Cavity deep.	Cooking	Pick mid August. Use August–September.
Summer Pound Royal (a.k.a. Pound Royale, Orange)		Unknown origin, US	<1800	Flesh white, fine-grained tender, juicy, subacid. Width 85 mm (3.3 in), height 71 mm (2.8 in). Stalk 20 mm (0.79 in). Tree is a strong grower. Once a profitable market variety.	Eating	Use August–September.
Summer Queen		US	<1806	Width 68 mm (2.7 in), height 60 mm (2.4 in). Stalk 33 mm (1.3 in). Cavity deep. Flesh yellow, acid, spicy, aromatic.	Cooking	Use July–August.
Summer Rambo (see Rambour Franc)
Summerred		British Columbia, Canada	1964, introduced 1974.	Red apple. Width 67 mm (2.6 in), height 67 mm (2.6 in). P (McIntosh x Golden Delicious) x unknown. Flesh is yellow to white, soft, juicy, subacid. Cold storage 1 °C 60 days.	Eating	Pick early September, PickG late August–early September. Use September–October.
Summer Rose		New Jersey	<1806	A small apple. One of the best early apples. Flesh white, juicy, subacid.	Cooking, eating	Use June–August.
Summerset		Ohio, US	2001, patented 2018	Parentage Honeycrisp x Fuji. Flesh crisp, firm, juicy. Susceptible to scab and powdery mildew.		
Summer Spitzenburg		New York, US	<1872	Flesh is juicy, aromatic, good to very good. Biennial.	Eating	Pick August. Use August–September.
Suncrisp		N.J. US	Selected 1971, introduced 1992	Width 79 mm, height 73 mm. Parentage Golden Delicious x (Cortland x Cox Orange Pippin). Overcolor 28%. Flesh cream-colored, firm, crisp, juicy, subacid, aromatic.	Eating	Pick 11 days after Golden Delicious.
Sundance		US	Cross made 1964, selected 1972, introduced 2004.	A greenish-yellow apple. Width 77 mm (3.0 in), height 68 mm (2.7 in). Stalk 18 mm (0.71 in). P Golden Delicious x (Winter Banana x PRI 2–19). SS 12.4%, TA 0.44%.	Eating, juice	Pick 10–17 October. Use November–April.
Sunrise		Summerland B.C. Canada	Introduced 1991	Width 75 mm, height 67 mm. A late summer apple. Flesh firm, crisp, juicy, sweet.	PickE late August. Use August - September.	
Sunsetagm		England	Raised 1918, named 1933	Easy to grow. Width 61–63 mm (2.4–2.5 in), height 51–54 mm (2.0–2.1 in). Stalk 15–22 mm (0.59–0.87 in). Has very similar flavour to Cox's Orange Pippin. Does not so well in heat. Cold storage 3 °C 150 days.	Eating	Pick late September. Use October–December.
Suntan		Kent, England	Raised 1955, introduced 1974	Fruits ripen orange-red, Flesh sharp and aromatic. Width 70 mm (2.8 in), height 54–56 mm (2.1–2.2 in). Stalk 15–20 mm (0.59–0.79 in). Tree vigorous. TRI	Eating	Pick mid-October. Use November–January.
Superior		Michigan, US	Introduced 1930	P Duchess x Wealthy.	Eating	Use–December.
Surprise		Possibly the US		A small apple. Flesh stained with red.	Eating	Use November–January.
Sutton Beauty		Sutton, Massachusetts	c. 1757	Flesh is whitish, crisp, tender, juicy, subacid.	Eating	Use November–February.
Swaar (a.k.a. Hardwick)		New York, US	<1804	Width 78 mm (3.1 in), height 61 mm (2.4 in). Stalk 19–26 mm (0.75–1.02 in). Flesh is yellowish, tender, aromatic, spicy, very good to best. Once one of the finest flavored apples in America. The trees bear fair crops.	Eating	PickE early October. Use October–March.
SweeTango (a.k.a. Minneiska)		Minnesota, US	Selected 1987. Introduced 2009.	A yellow to green apple with red overcolor (70–95%). Width 70–80 mm (2.8–3.1 in). Flesh is creamy white, crisp, juicy. subacid. Viewed as a successor to the Honeycrisp by many growers.	Eating	Pick 3–10 days before Gala.
Sweet Bough (a.k.a. Early Bough, Large Yellow Bough)		US	<1806	One of the finest summer apples, greenish-yellow. Flesh is white, juicy, slightly aromatic, good to very good. AC s.	Eating	Use August–September.
Sweet Delicious		Geneva, New York, US	Introduced 1922	P Deacon Jones x Delicious. DBH 156.	Eating, baking	Pick50 October 3. PickE early October. Use November–January.
Sweet McIntosh		Geneva, New York, US	Introduced 1922	P Lawver x McIntosh.	Eating, baking	
Sweet Pippin		US	<1830	Stalk short. Flesh is firm, moderately juicy, sweet. Good. Tree productive.	Eating	Use November–December
Sweet Pippin (see Moore Sweet)
Sweet Pippin (see Hog Island Sweet)
Sweet Rambo		Pennsylvania, US ?		Flesh whitish, juicy. Good to very good. Tree vigorous, not an early bearer.	Eating	Use October–December.
Sweet Romanite		US	<1850	Width 74 mm (2.9 in), height 61 mm (2.4 in). Stalk 15 mm (0.59 in). Flesh is yellow, juicy, very sweet. Good to very good. Tree hardy, moderate bearer.	Baking, cider, eating	Use December–April.
Sweet Russet		US	<1850	Width 74 mm (2.9 in), height 62 mm (2.4 in). Stalk slender, 11 mm (0.43 in). Flesh is yellow, tender, juicy, sweet. Tree moderately vigorous.	Baking	Use August.
Sweet Russet (see Pumpkin Russet)
Sweet Russet (see Cheeseboro)
Sweet Sixteen		Minnesota, US	Cross made 1937, selected 1950, introduced 1973.	Large fruit, some russeting near top. Diameter 69–89 mm (2.7–3.5 in). Moderately acidic taste. P (Malinda x unknown) x Northern Spy. Tree is moderately vigorous. DBH 125–135.	Eating	Pick45 October 14.
Sweet Winesap (a.k.a. Hendrick Sweet)		US	<1854	A medium to large sized apple. Flesh, white, firm, fine, crisp, tender, juicy, sweet. Good to very good.	Eating	Use November - March.
Sweet Zinger		Ohio, US	2001	Parentage Goldrush x Sweet 16. Resistant to fire blight and scab.	Eating	Pick early October in northeast Ohio.
Swiss Gourmet see Arlet
Switzer		Russia	<1870	Flesh is white, juicy, subacid, good. Biennial.	Cooking, eating	Pick August. Use September–October.
Syke House Russet (fr. Syke-House)		Yorkshire, England	1780	Width 65 mm, height 52 mm. Stalk 12 mm. Cells small, obovate, axile. Flesh yellowish, firm, crisp, juicy, subacid. One of the most excellent dessert apples. The tree is a free grower and an excellent bearer.	Eating	Use October–February

=== T ===
Common name	Image	Origin	First developed	Comment	Use	Pick/Use period
Talman's Sweet (see Tolman Sweet)
Talvikaneli (see Vinterkanel)
Talvikki		Finland	2003	A large green apple with red flush. P Lobo x Yläkautto.	Cooking, eating	Pick mid-October.
Tamplin (a.k.a. Cissy)		Monmouthshire, Wales	<1800	Crimson red with dark broken stripes. AM from RHS in 1902. Flesh is yellowish, poor.	Eating	PickE early September. Use September.
Taunton Cross		Bristol, England	1919	Parentage Wealthy x ? Flesh white, soft, subacid. Tree vigorous.	Eating	PickE mid September. Use October - November.
Teser		United States	1944	Resistant to scab.	Eating	
Tart Bough (a.k.a. Sour Bough)		US	<1830	Flesh is white, tender, juicy, subacid.		Use August.
Tart Bough (see Early Harvest)
Tart Bough (see Champlain)
Telamon (a.k.a. Waltz)		Kent, England	Raised 1976. Introduced 1989	Flesh: sweet, crisp, juicy. Parentage McIntosh Wijcik x Golden Delicious.	Eating	PickE early October
Telstar		New Zealand	1934	P Golden Delicious x Kidds Orange Red. Width 69 mm (2.7 in), height 56 mm (2.2 in). Stalk is long. Flesh is white, crisp, juicy, sweet.	Eating	Pick mid-October. Use November–December.
Tetofski		Russia	<1831	A small apple. Flesh is yellowish-white, firm, coarse, tender, aromatic juicy, subacid, fair to good.	Cooking	Use June–July
Tewkesbury (a.k.a. Tewkesbury Winter Blush)		New Jersey, US	<1850	Width 60 mm (2.4 in), height 45 mm (1.8 in). Stalk 11 mm (0.43 in). Flesh is yellow, subacid.	Eating	Use January–July.
Thomas Rivers (a.k.a. River's Codlin)		Hertfordshire, England	<1892	Round, conical, pale yellow with slight brownish flush, flesh crisp, yellowish, acid cooks extremely well. P Mother x Dumelow. First Class Certificate from RHS in 1892. Width and height 64 mm (2.5 in). Raised by Rivers Nursery.	Cooking	PickE early–mid-September. Use September–October.
Thompson		Iowa, US	<1892	Flesh is white, crisp, tender, juicy, subacid, fair to good. Stalk is medium-length.	Eating	Use October–December.
Thorle Pippin (see Whorle Pippin)
Tiganka (a.k.a. Tiganka Alaia)		Moldova	<1900	A red apple. Width 73–82 mm (2.9–3.2 in), height 70–75 mm (2.8–3.0 in). Weight 80–115 g (2.8–4.1 oz). Stalk short. Flesh is juicy, subacid.	Cooking, eating	Pick mid-September. Use October–November.
Tiganka Grie		Moldova	<1900	A green apple with red flush. Width 70–85 mm (2.8–3.3 in), height 70–85 mm (2.8–3.3 in), weight 85–125 g (3.0–4.4 oz). Stalk medium to long. Flesh is juicy, subacid.	Cooking, eating	
Tinmoth		Vermont, US	>1857	Flesh is tender, juicy, subacid, peculiar flavor, good. Tree is very productive.	Eating	Use October–December.
Titovka (a.k.a. Titus Apple)		Russia	<1870	Flesh is white, juicy, subacid, good to very good. Tree is vigorous.	Cooking	Use August–September.
Titus Pippin		Long Island, US	<1870	Flesh is whitish yellow, juicy, tender, subacid. Good. Tree is productive.	Eating	Use December–February.
Tobias		Finland	Introduced 2003	A red conical apple. P Lobo x Huvitus.	Cooking, eating	Pick early October.
Tolman Sweet (a.k.a. Talman's Sweet)		US	1822	Very sweet apple. Width 79 mm (3.1 in), height 67 mm (2.6 in). Stalk 27 mm (1.1 in). Once used to make dried fruit for winter. Flesh white, firm, dry, sweet, good to very good.	Cider, cooking	Use October–March.
Tom Putt		Trent, Dorset, England	<1800	Small to medium, flat and irregularly shaped apple. Green, usually covered entirely with a bright red blush. Width 65–78 mm (2.6–3.1 in), height 55–63 mm (2.2–2.5 in). Cells ovate, axile, open. Crisp, sharp flavour. An excellent cooker and ideal single-variety cider apple. Softens during storage. Tree is vigorous and precocious. Scab-resistant. Seedling found by a Rev. Tom Putt of Trent, Somerset, England in the late 1700s. Triploid.	Cider, cooking	PickE early September. Use September–November.
Tompkins King (or King)		United States	Possibly 1804	Extremely large apple, and of excellent quality both as a dessert fruit and for cooking. The fruit shape is uniform and the skin mostly red with some yellow stripes. The flesh is yellowish and crisp. The fruit does not keep as well as some other apple cultivars.	Eating	
Topaz		Czech Republic	1990	Parentage: Rubin × Vanda, scab-resistant, sharp flavour.	Cider, cooking, eating	Pick one week after Golden Delicious.
Tower of Glammis(fr. Tour de Glammis)		Angus, Scotland.	<1800	A first rate culinary apple, once very popular in Lanarkshire. Greenish in colour, with some russeting near the stalk considered normal. Width 73 mm (2.9 in), height 70 mm (2.8 in). Stalk 12–15 mm (0.47–0.59 in). Cells roundish obovate, abaxile. Triploid.	Cooking.	Pick late October. Use November–February.
Townsend		Pennsylvania, US	<1785	Stalk is long. Flesh is white, tender, subacid, good to very good. Tree is healthy, vigorous. Good to very good.	Eating	Pick late August.
Traders Fancy		Pennsylvania, US	<1840	Flesh is white, crisp, tender, juicy, subacid, good to very good. Tree is vigorous.	Cooking	Use January–May.
Trajan		Kent, England	Introduced 1989	Parentage Wijcik McIntosh x Golden Delicious. Dark red. Flesh is crisp, juicy, sweet. Pick September. Biennial bearing.	Eating	Use September–October.
Trenton Early		New Jersey, USA	Introduced 1852	Flesh is white, tender, juicy, subacid. Tree moderately vigorous, quite productive.	Cooking, eating	Use August–September.
Trogsta		Sweden	<1900	Width 59–71 mm (2.3–2.8 in), height 50–59 mm (2.0–2.3 in). Stalk 9 mm (0.35 in). Flesh is juicy, good.	Eating	Pick September.
Tropical Beauty		South Africa	c. 1930	P unknown. Flesh is soft, poor.	Eating	PickE early October. Use November–January.
Tropic Sweet		Florida	Introduced 1996	P polycross from Jerseymac x Anna selections. Width 70 mm (2.8 in). One of a handful of apple varieties that will grow in Florida; will not do well in cold weather at all.	Eating	
Trumbull Sweet (a.k.a. Fenton Sweet)		Ohio, US	<1850	Flesh is white, juicy, sweet. Tree is vigorous, productive, early bearer.	Baking	Use September–October
Tsáriskij schip		Estonia	<1880	Medium size conical. Yellow with red stripes.	Cooking, eating	Pick September. Use September.
Tsugaru		Aomori, Japan	1930	A large apple. Parentage Golden Delicious × Jonathan Flesh firm, tender, mild, sweet, juicy, subacid.	Eating	Pick 3 week before Delicious
Tufts		Wisconsin, US	1855	Flesh is crisp, mild subacid, fair to good. Stalk is long.	Eating	Use October–December.
Tulpachoken see Fallawater
Tumanga (a.k.a. Auralia)		Germany	1930	A green apple with red flush. Width 66–80 mm (2.6–3.1 in), height 52 mm (2.0 in), weight 110–195 g (3.9–6.9 oz). Density 0.82	Eating	PickE late September. PickG mid–late October. Pickg September 23–October 15. Use November–February.
Turley		Indiana, US	Introduced 1922.	P Winesap x unknown. Tree bears annually, very productive. DBH 162.	Cooking	Pick50 October 17.
Twenty Ounce		New York	<1844	Huge: apple weighs nearly 500 g (1.1 lb). Green overlaid with broad red striping. Stalk is short, thick. Flesh is whitish-yellow, tender, juicy, subacid, good. Excellent cooker. Nice juice qualities.	Cider, cooking, eating	Use September–October. PickE early October.
Tydeman's Early Worcester		England	Raised 1929, introduced 1945	Parentage: Mclntosh × Worcester Pearmain. Crimson over yellow background colour. Flesh is white, juicy, sweet with strong aroma. Width 60–69 mm (2.4–2.7 in), height 54–60 mm (2.1–2.4 in). Stalk 17–20 mm (0.67–0.79 in).	Eating	Pick50 August 22. PickE mid-August. Use August–mid-September.
Tydeman's Late Orange		England	Raised 1930, introduced 1949 or 1945	Parentage: Laxton Superb x Cox Orange Pippin. Good storage qualities, but loses fragrance with age. Width 58–65 mm (2.3–2.6 in), height 55–60 mm (2.2–2.4 in). Stalk 15–25 mm (0.59–0.98 in). Sometimes cultivated in California; one of a handful of British apples that will thrive in the state.	Eating	PickE mid-October. Use December–April.
Tydeman's Michaelmas Red see Michaelmas Red.
Tyler's Kernel		Herefordshire, England	<1883	A pale yellow apple. Width 64 mm (2.5 in), height 76 mm (3.0 in). Cells obovate, axile open or abaxile. FCC from RHS in 1883. Rather subject to canker.	Cooking	PickE mid-October. Use November–January.

=== U ===
Common name	Image	Origin	First developed	Comment	Use	Pick/Use period
Undine		Germany	1961	Green with some orange overcolour. Width 77–80 mm (3.0–3.1 in), height 68 mm (2.7 in). Weight 180–230 g (6.3–8.1 oz). Stalk 20–30 mm (0.79–1.18 in). P Jonathan x unknown. Cold storage 2 °C 180 days.	Eating	PickE mid-October. PickG late October. Use November–February.
Upton Pyne	Upton Pyne apple	Devon, England	Introduced 1910	A yellow apple with little or no flush. Width 82 mm (3.2 in), height 77 mm (3.0 in). Flesh is creamy white, firm, juicy, fair.	Cooking, eating	PickE late September. Use December–March.
Utter		Wisconsin, US	1855	Flesh is crisp, tender, juicy, subacid, good. Tree is a regular grower, healthy, productive.	Eating	Use October–December.
Uttwiler Spätlauber		Switzerland	1750		Eating	

=== V ===
Common name	Image	Origin	First developed	Comment	Use	Pick/Use period
Valinhense		Brazil		P unknown. Very firm tart apple.	Cooking	
Valmore		California, US	Introduced 1934	P unknown.	Cooking	
Vance Delicious		Virginia, US	Discovered 1930. Introduced 1935.	Mutation of Delicious.	Eating	
Vanderspiegel		Bennington, Vermont, US	<1875	Flesh is yellow, crisp, juicy, subacid. Tree is productive.	Eating	Use December–February.
Vandervere (a.k.a. Large Vandervere, Vandervere Pippin, Yellow Vandervere)		US	<1806	Flesh is yellow, firm, juicy, acid. Tree is vigorous, productive, bearing annually.	Cooking	Use December.
Venus Pippin		Devonshire, England	c. 1800	A pale yellow-green apple. AM from RHS in 1899. Flesh is tender, pale yellow, juicy.	Cooking, eating	PickE early August. Use September–October.
Verorja		Albania		A greenish yellow apple with red stripes. Width 50–60 mm (2.0–2.4 in), height 50–60 mm (2.0–2.4 in). Weight 100–120 g (3.5–4.2 oz). Flesh is crisp, juicy, subacid.	Eating	Pick late July–early August.
Vicking		South Daktota, US	Introduced 1925	Flesh is brisk, soft, juicy.	Eating	Pick late August. Use August–September.
Victoria Sweet		Possibly New York, US	c. 1840	A red apple. Tree is vigorous. Flesh is yellow, firm, tender, juicy, sweet, good to very good.	Eating, cooking, baking	Use October–January.
Victory 1		Minnesota, US	Introduced 1943	Flesh is white, juicy, aromatic.	Eating	Use October 15–March 15.
Victory 2 (see George Carpenter)
Vidovdanka		Serbia	<1900	A green apple with red flush covering 85%. Width 62 mm (2.4 in), height 62–74 mm (2.4–2.9 in). Weight 130 g (4.6 oz). Flesh is juicy, acid.	Eating	Pick August.
Vinterkanel (a.k.a. Talvikaneli)		Finland	Introduced 2003	A red apple. P Lobo x Rödkanel.	Cooking, eating	Pick early October.
Violette		France	1628	A culinary apple of second-rate quality.	Cooking	PickE mid-September. Use October–March
Virginia Greening		Virginia	<1835	Width 88 mm (3.5 in), height 65 mm (2.6 in). Flesh is white, subacid.	Cooking	Use January–April.
Virginischer Rosenapfel (cs. Virginské růžové, de. Virginischer Rosenapfel, fr. Rose de Virginie, pl. Rozanka wirgioniska, sv. Vitgylling, Virginskt Rosenäpple)		Europe	<1800	Width 69 mm (2.7 in), height 60 mm (2.4 in). Stalk 15 mm (0.59 in). Flesh is sweet, subacid, fair to good.	Cooking	PickE late August. Use early September.
Vista Bella		New Brunswick, New Jersey, US	Cross made 1956, selected 1962, introduced 1974.	A yellow-green apple with red flush. Width 70 mm (2.8 in), height 60 mm (2.4 in). Weight 100 g (3.5 oz). Stalk 20–25 mm (0.79–0.98 in). Flesh is creamy white, aromatic, crisp. P ((Melba x Sonora) x ((Williams x Starr) x USDA34)) x Julyred.	Eating	Ripens with Melba. PickE early August. PickG late August–mid-September
Vitgylling see Virginischer Rosenapfel
Von Zuccalmaglios Reinette (cs. Zukalmagliova reneta)		Germany	1878	Width 65 mm (2.6 in), height 61 mm (2.4 in), weight 115 g (4.1 oz). Flesh is crisp, juicy, aromatic, subacid to sweet. Biennial. Cold storage 0 °C 180 days. VitC 14. Density 0.78	Eating, cooking	PickE mid-October. Use November–March.
Vuokko		Finland	Introduced 1999	A green apple. P Melba x Huvitus. Flesh is juicy, sweet, subacid.	Cooking, eating	Pick late August–early September.
Vusanka		Montenegro	<1900	A greenish yellow apple with red flush. Width 72 mm (2.8 in), height 63 mm (2.5 in). Weight 132 g (4.7 oz). Stalk medium to long. Flesh is juicy, sweet.	Eating, cider	Pick early October. Use November–April.

=== W ===
Common name	Image	Origin	First developed	Comment	Use	Pick/Use period
Wadhurst Pippin		Sussex, England	<1850	A culinary apple of excellent quality. Cells ovate, axile, slit.	Cooking, eating	PickE early October. Use October to February.
Wagener (cs. Wagenerovo)		New York, US	1791	Antique American variety, known since Colonial times. Tree is hardy, early bearer, scab-resistant. Green with red flush. Flesh is yellowish, tender, subacid and vinous, very good to best. Width 70–88 mm (2.8–3.5 in), height 51–63 mm (2.0–2.5 in), stalk 13–26 mm (0.51–1.02 in). Keeps very well. Very versatile in kitchen; not only does it cook well, but makes a good single-variety cider. Wagener is a parent of Idared, to which it imparts its keeping and cooking qualities.	Cider, cooking, eating	PickE early October. Use November–February.
Wanstall		Kent, England	raised early 1800s	A dessert apple of the first quality, equal in flavour to the Ribston Pippin and will keep until May. Cells obovate, axile. Flesh is yellow, firm crisp, juicy, rich, sugary, and highly flavoured.	Eating	
Warder		Ohio, US	Introduced 1937	P Rome Beauty x unknown.	Eating	Pick October 1 in Ohio.
Warner's King agm		Kent, England	c. 1700	Oblong and light green. Very tart. Width 90–95 mm (3.5–3.7 in), height 62–76 mm (2.4–3.0 in). Stalk 15–20 mm (0.59–0.79 in). Cells roundish ovate, abaxile. Should be cooked before eating; not suitable as an uncooked eating apple. Triploid.	Cooking	PickE late September. Use November–February.
Washington Strawberry		New York, US	<1849	Width 88 mm (3.5 in), height 75 mm (3.0 in). Stalk 16 mm (0.63 in). Flesh is yellow, crisp, tender, juicy, brisk subacid.	Eating	PickE mid-September. Use September–October.
Washu 1984		Japan	c. 1920	Conical with light green skin and dark freckles, with a firm, white, bruise-resistant flesh and a sweet, low-acid flavor with tropical undertones.	Eating	
Water		Pennsylvania, US	<1850	Width 70 mm (2.8 in), height 70 mm (2.8 in). Stalk 16 mm (0.63 in). Flesh is white, tender, juicy, subacid.	Eating	Use October–November.
Waterman Sweet		US	<1875	Yellow with red flush. Flesh is yellow, juicy, sweet.	Eating	Use December–March.
Wealthy(ru. Plodorodnoe.)		Excelsior, Minnesota, US	<1860	Pretty reddish pink coat. Flesh is white, fine, crisp, tender, very juicy, subacid, aromatic, good to very good. Believed at one time Minnesota was too cold to grow apples until "Wealthy" was cultivated. Now a parent to many apples for resistance to temperatures below freezing. Still available in upper Midwest. Width 67–75 mm (2.6–3.0 in), height 53–61 mm (2.1–2.4 in). Stalk 10–22 mm (0.39–0.87 in). Parentage Jonathan x Ducess of Oldenburg. VitC 14. DBH 116.	Eating	Pick50 September 1. PickE mid-September. Use September–December.
Webster		Geneva, New York, US	1921, Introduced 1938	P (Ben Davis x Jonathan) x (Ben Davis x Jonathan). A large red apple. Triploid.	Cooking	PickE early October. Use October–December.
Wedge		Minnesota, US	1912, Introduced 1922	P Ben Davis x unknown. A large apple.		Use October–November.
Weidner's Goldreinette(fr. Reinette Weidner)		Germany	1844	Width 82–91 mm, height 75 mm. Stalk 13 mm. Flesh, yellowish, fine-grained, tender, crisp, juicy, aromatic, subacid.	Eating	PickE mid-October. Use January–March
Weisser Rosmarinapfel see White Romarin
Weisser Taffetapfel (a.k.a. Weisser Winter taffetapfel, fr. Taffetas Blanc, ru. Taftianoe beloe zimnee)		?	<1820	A yellow apple with red overcolor. Width 63–67 mm, height 47–54 mm. Stalk 17 mm. Flesh white, juicy, subacid.	Eating, Cooking	Pick October. Use November - April.
Weisskante		Germany	<1850	Width 66 mm (2.6 in), height 66 mm (2.6 in). Stalk 16 mm (0.63 in).	Cooking, eating	Use November–March.
Well apple (see Domine)
Well apple (see Titus Pippin)
Wellspur			Discovered 1952, introduced 1958.	A sport of Starking. Cold storage 0.5 °C 120 days.	Eating	
Welschisner		Austria	1659	A greenish-yellow apple with red flush. Width 75 mm (3.0 in), height 62 mm (2.4 in). Stalk is short. Flesh is whitish yellow, aromatic, subacid. Quality is good for eating.	Eating	Pick mid-October. Use January–May.
Werder Golden Reinette		Potsdam, Germany	<1904	Golden yellow striped with crimson. Width 63 mm (2.5 in), height 57 mm (2.2 in). Tree is vigorous. Flesh is firm, yellowish, sweet, good. Am from RHS in 1904.	Eating	
Western Beauty(a.k.a. Musgroves Cooper, Big Rambo, Ohio Beauty)		US	<1850	Width 89 mm (3.5 in), height 74 mm (2.9 in). Stalk 20 mm (0.79 in). Flesh is light yellow, tender, juicy, vinous, subacid. Tree is vigorous, productive, early bearer.	Cooking, eating	Use August–December.
Western Giant		California, US	Introduced 1948	A large Apple P unknown. Ripens before Red Astrachan.		
Westfield Seek-No-Further (a.k.a. Westfield)		Westfield, Massachusetts, US	<1800	A medium-sized conic to truncate-conic apple. Width 70 mm (2.8 in), height 58 mm (2.3 in). Stalk 20 mm (0.79 in). Greenish-yellow, dull skin, flushed orange with carmine stripes, russet dots and patches. Shaded fruit are often irregularly russeted all over, with little colour showing. Flesh is light buttery-yellow, firm but tender, and moderately fine-grained. Flavour is nicely balanced, a honey-like sweetness balanced with a lemon-like citric acidity, rich, notes of pear and vanilla. Vigorous grower, some disease resistance.	Eating	PickE late September. Use October–December.
Wheeler's Russet		England	<1717	Medium-sized fruit, entirely covered with pale yellowish grey russet. Cells ovate, axile, closed. A highly flavoured dessert apple of the first quality. Triploid.	Eating	PickE late October. Use November–April
Whetstone		Missouri, US	Introduced 1935	P Conard x Delicious. Quality is fair. Tree is vigorous.		
White Astrachan		Sweden or Russia	<1800	Width 71 mm (2.8 in), height 60 mm (2.4 in). Stalk 10–15 mm (0.39–0.59 in).Cells ovate axile. Flesh white, semi-transparent, tender, juicy, subacid.	Eating	Pick August.
White Doctor		Pennsylvania, US	<1875	A large greenish-yellow apple. Stalk short. Tree is vigorous. Flesh is white, subacid, good.	Cooking	Use September–October.
White June (see Yellow June)
White Pippin (a.k.a. Canada Pippin)		US or Canada	<1848	A yellow apple. Width 80 mm (3.1 in), height 65–70 mm (2.6–2.8 in). Stalk 12–18 mm (0.47–0.71 in). Flesh is white, crisp, juicy, subacid, very good to best.	Eating	Use January–March.
White Romarin (de. Weisser Rosmarinapfel, Edelweisser, fr. Romarin blanc, Romarin blanche, ru. Rosmarin belîi)		Italy	<1798	A yellow conical apple. With 60 – 70 mm, height 66–73 mm. Stalk long. Flesh fine, tender, sweet to subacid.	Eating	
White Sweet		New Jersey, US	<1875	Tree isvigorous. Flesh is white, sweet, good.	Cider, cooking	Use September–October.
White Transparent		Latvia	1850	Very pale green skin. Flesh is white, firm, crisp, tender, juicy, subacid, good. Fruit bruises easily and goes soft once harvested. Width 55–72 mm (2.2–2.8 in), height 55–68 mm (2.2–2.7 in), weight 85–100 g (3.0–3.5 oz). Stalk 26 mm (1.0 in). AM from RHS in 1895. Cold storage 4 °C 20 days. VitC 15. Density 0.77 DBH 75	Cooking, pie, eating	Pick45 August 1. Pick50 July 22. Pick55 July 10. PickE late July–early August. Pickg July 15–August 7. Use July–August.
White Winter Pearmain		US	<1830	Width 74–79 mm (2.9–3.1 in), height 62–73 mm (2.4–2.9 in). Stalk 15–20 mm (0.59–0.79 in). Tree is vigorous. Flesh is yellow, crisp, juicy, very good.	Eating, cooking	Use December–March.
Whitney Russet		US	<1850	Width 67 mm (2.6 in), height 52 mm (2.0 in). Stalk 14 mm (0.55 in). Flesh id grennish-yellow, juicy, subacid, aromatic, spicy.	Eating	Use December–February.
Whorle Pippin (a.k.a. Lady Derby, Thorle Pippin)		Scotland	<1831	Summer dessert apple of first-rate quality. Flesh white, firm, crisp and very juicy, with a brisk flavour. Width 65 mm (2.6 in), height 51 mm (2.0 in).	Eating	PickE late August. Use August–September.
Wickham's Pearmain		Hampshire, England	<1875	A pearmain-shaped yellow apple with red overcolour on the side next the sun. Width and height 50 mm (2.0 in). Flesh is greenish yellow, crisp, juicy, and highly flavoured. An excellent dessert apple.	Eating	
Wickson		California, US	Introduced 1944	A red oblong apple. P Yellow Newtown x Spitzenberg crab. Flesh juicy.	Jam, jelly, cider	
Wickstrands favorit		Sweden	<1900	A green apple. Width 65 mm (2.6 in), height 67 mm (2.6 in). Stalk 16 mm (0.63 in). Flesh sweet.	Eating	Pick October. Use October–December.
Wijcik McIntosh		British Columbia, Canada	Mid-1960s	A green apple with 70% red overcolor. Width 80 mm (3.1 in), height 62 mm (2.4 in). Weight 164 g (5.8 oz). Mutation of McIntosh apple that first showed columnar ornamental properties. SS 12.6 TA 0.88	Eating, cooking, ornamental	
Wild Twist		US	2011	Honeycrisp x Cripps Pink. Commercially available in 2020.		
Wilhelmapfel (see Kaiser Wilhelm)
William Crump		Worcestershire, England	<1908	High-quality, well-coloured dessert apple. Raised at Rowe's Nurseries, Worcester, England. AM from RHS in 1908. First Class Certificate from RHS in 1910. A yellow apple half covered with red flush. Width 70–74 mm (2.8–2.9 in), height 58–63 mm (2.3–2.5 in). Stalk 13 mm (0.51 in).	Eating	PickE mid-October. Use December–February.
Williams Favourite (a.k.a. Williams, Williams Early)		Roxbury, Massachusetts, US	c. 1750	Width 56–69 mm (2.2–2.7 in), height 52–69 mm (2.0–2.7 in). Stalk 15 mm (0.59 in). AM from RHS in 1895. Flesh is crisp, tender, juicy, subacid, aromatic, good. Tree is moderately vigorous.	Eating	Pick September. Use September–November.
Williams Pride (a.k.a. Co-op 23)		Indiana, US	Cross made 1973, selected 1979, introduced 1987	Flesh is light cream, firm, crisp, juicy, subacid, spicy, rich, excellent. Purple-red overcolor, nearly 100%. Width 74 mm (2.9 in), height 64 mm (2.5 in). Parentage PRI 1018-101 x NJ 50.	Eating	Pick45 August 15. Pick55 August 1.
Willie Sharpe		New Zealand	Early 1900s	Light green, round, medium-sized apple. Flesh is sweet, subacid, good.	Eating	
Willis Sweet (a.k.a. Pear Lot)		Long Island, US	c. 1800	Width 83 mm (3.3 in), height 73 mm (2.9 in). Stalk 22 mm (0.87 in). Very good. Flesh is juicy, sweet.	Eating, cooking, baking.	Use August–September.
Willow Twig (a.k.a. James River)		US	<1848	Yellow with red flush. Width 84 mm (3.3 in), height 68–73 mm (2.7–2.9 in). Stalk 22 mm (0.87 in). Flesh is pleasant, subacid. Valuable for late keeping		
Windsor		US	<1889	Flesh is juicy, aromatic, good to very good.	Eating	Use October–March.
Wine		US	<1850	A large apple. Flesh is yellow, juicy, acid to subacid. Tree is very large.	Cooking, eating	Use November–December.
Winecrisp (a.k.a. Coop 31)		New Jersey, US	Cross made 1969, selected 1976	A round to oblong 100% red apple. Similar in shape and color to Winesap. Diameter 60–65 mm (2.4–2.6 in), height 60–63 mm. Weight 200 g (7.1 oz). Stalk 5–8 mm (0.20–0.31 in). Flesh is yellow-white, crisp, juicy. Tree moderately vigorous, annual and heavy bearing. SS 12.75 DBH 172.	Eating	Pick45 October 10. Pick55 September 30. Use October–April.
Winesap		United States	1817	Sweet with tangy finish. Reddish blush flecked with some green. Width 67 mm (2.6 in), height 63 mm (2.5 in). Stalk 17–20 mm (0.67–0.79 in). Flesh is yellow, firm, coarse, crisp, juicy, subacid, good to very good. Cold storage 0 °C 150 days.	Cider, eating	Pick45 October 20. PickE late October. Use October–March.
Winston (Winter King) agm		Berkshire, England	c. 1935	A yellow to green apple with red flush and stripes (40–70%). Cox Orange × Worcester Pearmain. Originally called Winter King because of its extraordinary keeping ability, renamed during World War II for Winston Churchill. Width 65–72 mm (2.6–2.8 in), height 60–64 mm (2.4–2.5 in). Stalk 10–20 mm (0.39–0.79 in). Cold storage 3-4 °C 140 days.	Eating	PickE mid-October. Use December –April.
Winter Banana (cs. Banánové zimní, fr. Banane d'hiver, ru. Zimnee bananovoe, Banan zimnii, Bananovoe)		Adamsboro, Cass County, Indiana, US	1876	Large, late dessert apple for use in December to March. Award of Merit from RHS in 1912. A golden yellow apple. 25–75% flushed with pinkish brown. Width 78 mm (3.1 in), height 71 mm (2.8 in). Flesh is yellow, firm, crisp, aromatic, juicy, mild subacid good to very good. VitC 13–20.	Eating	PickE early October. PickG mid–late October. Use December–March.
Winter Gem		Faversham, Kent, England	raised 1975, introduced 1993	Flesh crisp, juicy, aromatic.	Eating	PickE early October. Use November - January.
Winter Harvey		US	<1850	Flesh us white, tender, juicy, subacid, good. Tree is vigorous.	Eating	Use January–March
Winter Maiden's Blush		Pennsylvania, US	<1850	Flesh is white, crisp, tender, subacid, very good. Stalk is short.	Eating	
Winter Pearmain		England	<1600	A narrow conical ribbed apple. Width 70–80 mm (2.8–3.1 in), height 70–80 mm (2.8–3.1 in). Stalk is very short. Cells ovate, axile. Flesh is yellow, firm crisp, juicy and a very pleasant flavour.	Eating, cooking	PickE early October. Use December–April.
Winter Pomeroy		Possibly England	<1850	Width 76 mm (3.0 in), height 64 mm (2.5 in). Stalk is long. Flesh is yellow, crisp, sub-acid.	Cooking	Use December–January.
Winter Prinzenapfel		Germany	<1887	Width 69 mm (2.7 in), height 69–72 mm (2.7–2.8 in). Stalk 12 mm (0.47 in). Flesh is juicy, sweet, good.	Eating, cooking	Use December–March.
Winter Quarrenden (a.k.a. Stubb's Seedlin)		Nottinghamshire, England	<1895	A bright crimson apple. Width 63 mm (2.5 in), height 57 mm (2.2 in). AM from RHS in 1895. P London Pippin x Devonshire Quarrenden. Flesh is greenish-yellow, poor.	Eating	PickE early October. Use November–December.
Winter Quittenapfel			<1830	Width 72 mm (2.8 in), height 58–60 mm (2.3–2.4 in). Stalk 11 mm (0.43 in).	Cooking, eating	Use December–April.
Winter Quoining		England	<1700	Width 57 mm (2.2 in), height 64 mm (2.5 in). Cells obovate, abaxile. Flesh is greenish yellow, tender, soft, not very juicy, sugary, perfumed.	Cooking, eating	Use November–May.
Winterrambour (see Rheinischer Winterrambour)
Wintertaffetapfel (a.k.a. Weisser Wintertaffetapfel)			<1797	A yellow apple. Width 65–75 mm (2.6–3.0 in), height 45–55 mm (1.8–2.2 in). VitC 8–21.	Eating, juice	Use December–April
Winter Zitronenapfel (a.k.a. Winter-Citronenapfel, Citron d'hiver, Reinette du roi, König's Reinette, cs. Citronové zimní)		Germany	<1726	Width 72–79 mm (2.8–3.1 in), height 57–67 mm (2.2–2.6 in).Flesh yellow to white, subacid, not aromatic. TRI	Cooking, eating, cider	Pick October. Use December–April.
Winthrop Greening (a.k.a. Lincoln Pippin, Hove Apple)		Winthrop, Maine, US	<1875	Stalk is short. Flesh is white, tender, juicy, subacid.	Eating	Use September.
Witos		Poland				
Wolf River		Fremont County, Wisconsin, US	<1875	Apple very large, some growing to size of large grapefruit. Red with yellow blush. Once very popular commercial apple in United States but presently relegated to upper Midwest if grown for profit. Occasionally can be found growing wild in backcountry thickets or abandoned land in Shenandoah Valley. Named for area where found. Flesh is white, firm, tender, juicy, aromatic, subacid, fair to good. Feral trees can be brought back with care and pruning. Width 80 mm (3.1 in), height 62 mm (2.4 in).	Cooking, eating	Pick45 September 5. Pick55 August 15. PickE mid-September. Use October–December.
Woltmann's Reinette (a.k.a. Celler Dickstiel, Krügers Dickstiel)		Bremen, Germany	<1850	A yellow apple with red overcolor. Width 71 mm (2.8 in), height 56 mm (2.2 in). Stalk 12 mm (0.47 in). Flesh white, juicy, subacid, aromatic.	Eating	Pick October. Use November–March.
Wood's Greening (a.k.a. cs. Simirenkova reneta, fr. Reinette verte de Simirenko, Reinette verte incomparable, ru. Reinette Simerenko)		Ukraine	<1895	A golden yellow apple. Width 70–78 mm (2.8–3.1 in), height 54–65 mm (2.1–2.6 in).	Cooking, eating	Pick October.
Woolbrook Pippin		England	Raised 1903, introduced 1921	Yellow with red flush and Russet. Width 67 mm, height 56mm. Stalk is short. AM from RHS in 1929. Flesh is white, hard, sweet, aromatic.	Eating	PickE mid-September. Use October - December
Woolbrook Russet		Devon, England	1903	P Bramley x King Acre Pippin. Width 84 mm (3.3 in), height 67 mm (2.6 in). Stalk is short. Flesh is white, juicy, acid. AM from RHS in 1930.	Cooking	PickE mid-October. Use December–March.
Worcester Pearmain agm		Worcestershire, England	Introduced 1873	Conical, entirely covered with scarlet. FCC from RHS in 1875. Crisp and sweet strawberry flavour when ripe. Width 60–75 mm (2.4–3.0 in), height 50–65 mm (2.0–2.6 in). Cells obovate, axile, slit. Cold storage 1 °C 180 days. VitC 8.	Eating	PickE early–mid-September. Use September–October.
Wormsley Pippin see Reinette von Wormsley
Wright		Missouri, US	Introduced 1942	P Ben Davis x Jonathan. Fruit is large, good flavor.	Eating	
Wrixparent		Magnolia, Delaware, US	Discovered 1920, Introduced 1940	P Transparent x unknown. Ripens early.	Eating	PickE late July–early August.
Wyken Pippin		England or Netherland	<1720	Flat round, even, greenish yellow, with delicious flavour. Width 59 mm (2.3 in), height 50 mm (2.0 in). Cells obovate, axile, closed.	Eating	PickE mid-October. Use November–February.

=== Y ===
Common name	Image	Origin	First developed	Comment	Use	Pick/Use period
Yakima Newtown		Washington, US	Introduced 1949	Mutation of Yellow Newtown.	Cooking, cider, eating	
Yates		Georgia, US	<1865	A small apple. Flesh is white, tender, juicy, subacid, good.	Eating	Use March·May.
Yellow Bellflower (a.k.a. Connecticut Seek-No-Further, cs. Krasokvět žlutý, de. Gelber Bellefleur, fr. Belle fleur jaune, Belle flavoise, pl. Pepina Linneusza, ru. Jioltîi belflior, Krasotvet)		Burlington, New Jersey, US	<1800	A yellow apple. Width 72–85 mm (2.8–3.3 in), height 72–98 mm (2.8–3.9 in), weight 160 g (5.6 oz). Stalk 11–26 mm (0.43–1.02 in). A favorite for baked apples. Banana flavour. Tree is large, vigorous. Flesh is yellow, tender, juicy, crisp, subacid, very good. VitC 18. Density 0.77.	Cooking. Eating.	PickE early–mid-October. PickG late October. Use December–February.
Yellow Forset		Los Angeles, US	<1885	Flesh is white, tender, crisp, juicy, aromatic, subacid, good.	Eating	Use January–June.
Yellow Ingestrie		Shropshire, England	c. 1800	Small, even, golden yellow apple. P Orange Pippin x Golden Pippin. Flesh is firm, very juicy and delicately flavoured. Width 53 mm (2.1 in), height 59 mm (2.3 in). Cells ovate, axile, closed.	Eating	PickE early September. Use September–October.
Yellow June (a.k.a. White June)		Southern US	<1865	Flesh is white, tender, juicy, brisk, subacid, good. Stalk is long. Tree is vigorous, abundant bearer.	Eating	Use June, July (southern US), August (northern US).
Yellow Newtown (see Newtown Pippin)
Yellow Transparent (see White Transparent)
Yopp (a.k.a. Yopp's Favorite)		Georgia, US	<1857	Flesh is white, tender, juicy, subacid, good. Stalk is short.	Eating	Use November.
York		Massachusetts, US	<1865	Flesh is whitish, tender, juicy, subacid, good to very good. Stalk is short.	Cooking	Use October–November.
York-A-Red		West Virginia, US	1931. Introduced 1937.	Mutation of York Imperial.	Eating, cider, juice	
York Imperial		York, Pennsylvania, US	1820	Flesh is yellowish, tender, juicy, subacid, aromatic. Tree is healthy, productive. Preserves well, lop-sided shape. DBH 165–167.	Cider, cooking, eating	Pick55 September 30. Use November–February.
Yorking		Pennsylvania, US	1925. Introduced 1932.	Mutation of York Imperial	Eating, cider, juice	
Yorkshire Greening		Yorkshire, England	<1803	Width 92 mm (3.6 in), height 76 mm (3.0 in). Stalk is short to medium. Cells obovate, abaxile. Tree is very dwarfed. Flesh is white, firm, dry, acid. Triploid.	Cooking	PickE early-mid October. Use November–March.

=== Z ===
Common name	Image	Origin	First developed	Comment	Use	Pick/Use period
Zabergäu Renette		Germany	1875, introduced 1924	Large yellow apple with russet, somewhat like Belle de Boskoop. Width 70–85 mm (2.8–3.3 in), height 60–75 mm (2.4–3.0 in), weight 128–208 g (4.5–7.3 oz). Cold storage 4 °C 180 days. High in sugar; 14.8%. VitC 14. Density 0.84	Eating	PickE early-mid October. PickG mid–late October. Pickg October 15–30. Use October–March.
Zestar		Minnesota, US	Introduced 1996	Red and greenish-yellow, round, sweet and tangy, preserves well	Cooking, eating	Pick45 August 20. Pick55 August 10. Use August.
Zigeunerin		Riga	<1930	A yellow apple with red flush (50–90%). Width 83 mm (3.3 in), height 79 mm (3.1 in). Stalk 16 mm (0.63 in).	Eating	Use September
Zimska Kolačara		Serbia	<1900	A greenish yellow apple. Width 55–65 mm (2.2–2.6 in), height 65–75 mm (2.6–3.0 in), weight 170–210 g (6.0–7.4 oz). Stalk is short. Flesh is firm, sweet, juicy.	Eating, cooking, pie	Pick late September–early October.
Zimtrenette (a.k.a. Zimmtreinette)		Sachsen, Germany		A yellow apple with russet and red overcolor. Width 55–70 mm (2.2–2.8 in), height 50–60 mm (2.0–2.4 in). Flesh is greenish-white, crisp, juicy, subacid.	Eating, cooking, juice	Use November–February.
Zhigulevskoe		St Petersburg, Russia		Parentage Duchess of Oldenburg x Wagenar Prizovoe. Flesh soft juicy.	Eating	PickE late September. Use September–November.
Zoar Greening		Ohio, US	<1865	Flesh is white, tender, juicy, subacid, good.	Eating	Use November–December.
Zoete Bloemée		Possibly the Netherlands		A yellow to green apple with red stripes. Width 80 mm (3.1 in), height 66 mm (2.6 in). Stalk 15 mm (0.59 in).		Use September
Zoete Campagner		Netherlands		A green apple with red flush (50–90%). Width 72 mm (2.8 in), height 55 mm (2.2 in). Stalk 15 mm (0.59 in).	Cooking	Use October–February
Zoete Ermgaarde		Netherlands	<1860	A yellow conical apple with red flush. Width 68 mm (2.7 in), height 60 mm (2.4 in). Stalk 14 mm (0.55 in). Flesh is cream, crisp, firm, subacid.	Eating, cooking	PickE mid-October. Use November–April.
Zomer Delicious		Wageningen, Netherlands		A yellow apple reminiscent of Golden Delicious. Flesh soft, juicy.	Eating	PickE early September. Use September - October.
Zuccalmaglio (see Von Zuccalmaglios Reinette)

== See also ==
- Cooking apple
- Lists of cultivars
- List of apple dishes
- List of Japanese apple cultivars
- Welsh apples
