= Red Autumn Calville =

Apple Ccltivar

Red Autumn-Calville
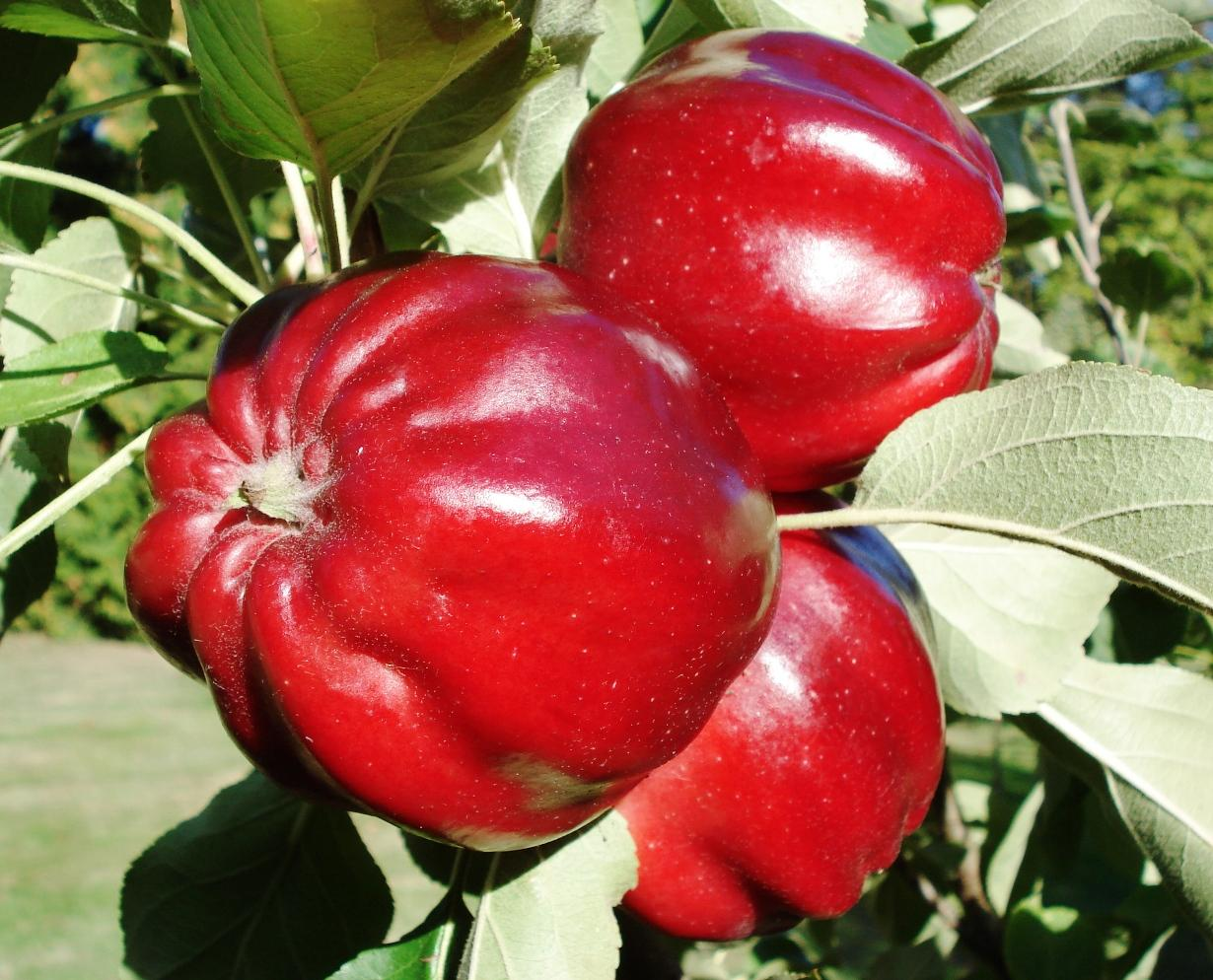
- Genus: Malus
- Species: Domestica
- Cultivar group: Calville
- Marketing names: Calleville rouge d'automne (franc.); Edelkönig
- Breeder: Claude St. Etienne
- Origin: Auvergne

The Red Autumn-calville is a type of table fruit apple. This very old type of cultivated apple of unknown origin (speculated to be French or German) was first mentioned by a French monk called Dom Claude Saint-Étienne in 1670. In the past, it was very common across Central Europe, but it is now very rare.

The Red Autumn-Calville is a pomological cultivar. The flesh is white although often has a reddish tint. The juice is aromatic and has a red tinge. The skin is dark red although occasionally has areas which are lighter.

The tree is susceptible to diseases and pests, it needs appropriate conditions such as good, soil and a warm location.

Since the seed cavities are relatively large in comparison to other apples some specimens can form a "Rattle Apple" where when shaken the seeds inside rattle audibly.

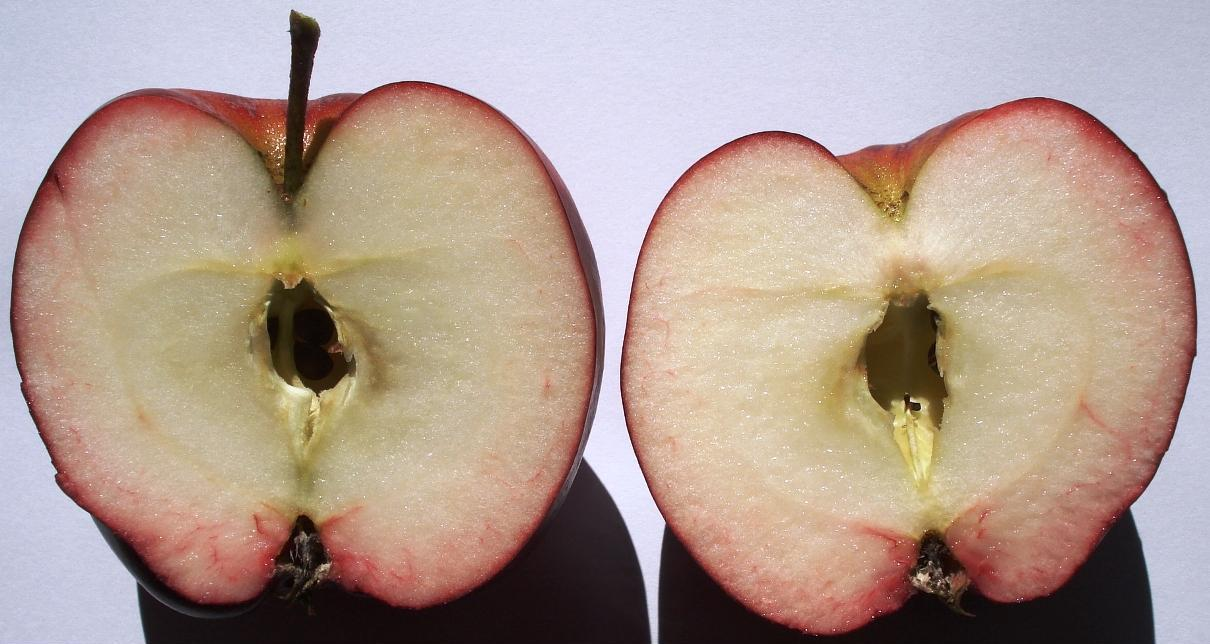
Cross section of the Red Autumn-Calville

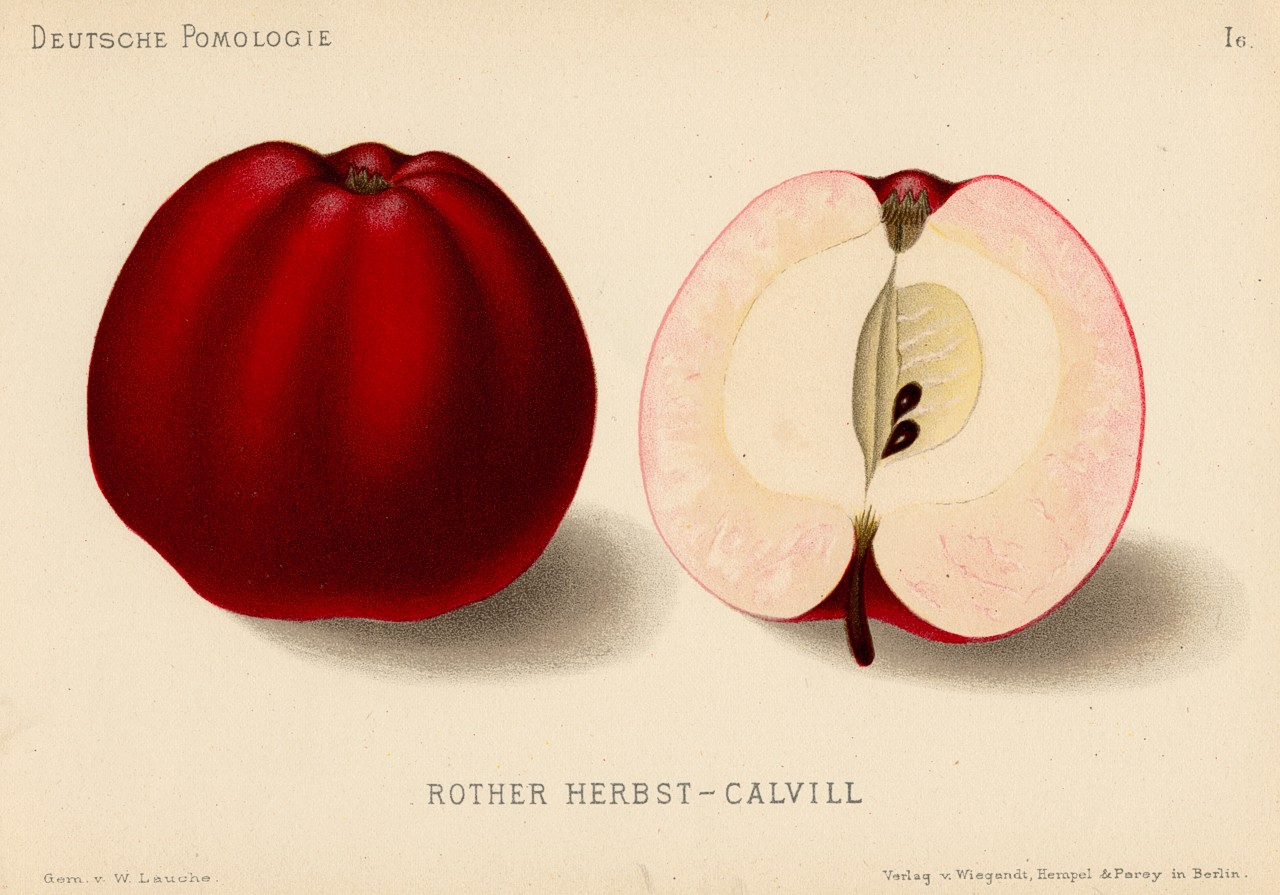
Red Autumn-Calville from "Deutsche Pomologie" (German Pomology) 1882
