= Manks Codlin =

Apple cultivar

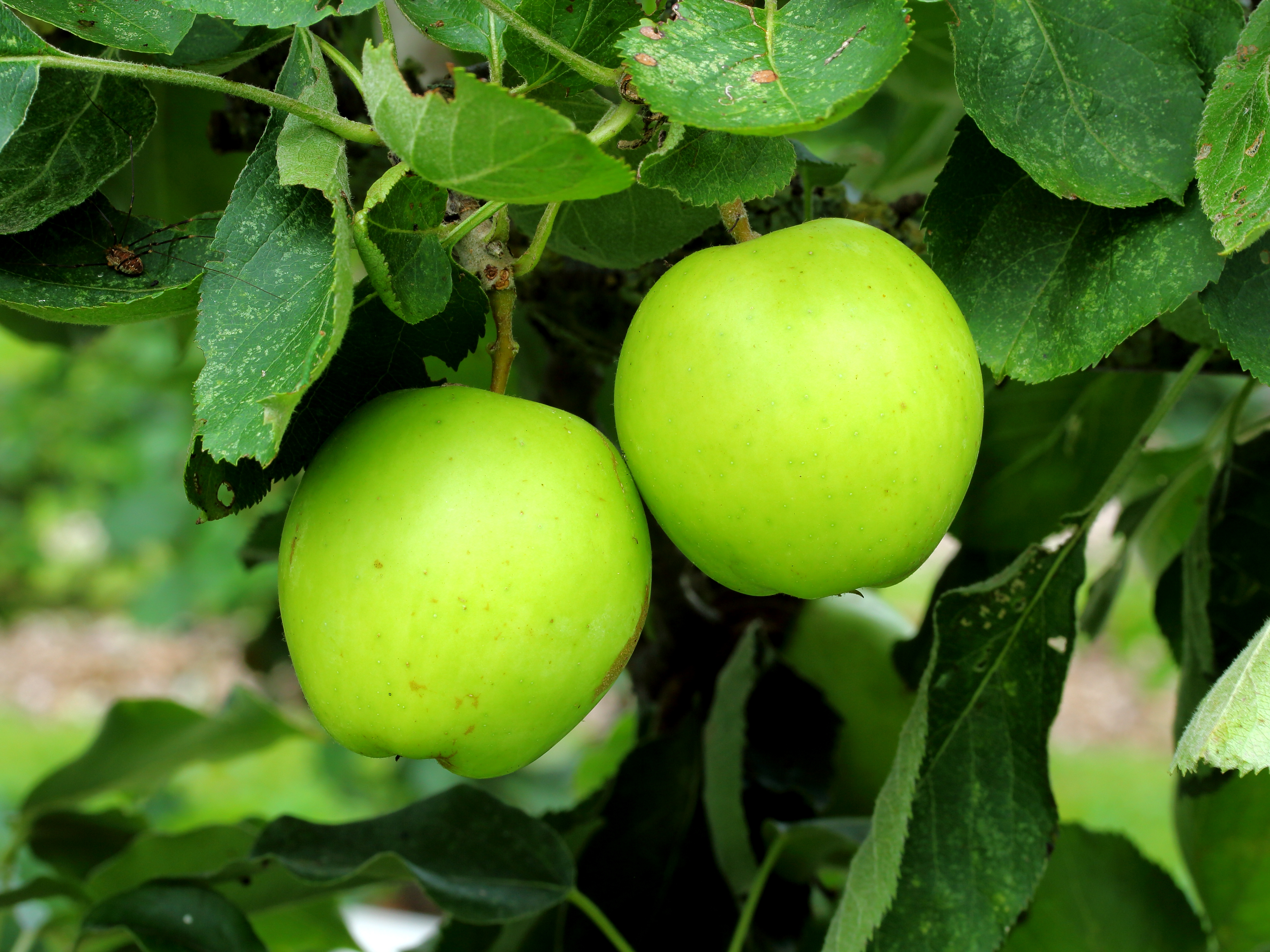
Manks Codlin in Kruidhof botanical garden.

Manks Codlin is an early cultivar selected from the domesticated apple that were growing at Isle of Man. It has many other names, including 'Winter Saint Lawrence' and 'Eva'. It first fruited in 1815. This cultivar is considered particularly cold hardy and well suited to exposed sites and poor soils.

This cultivar produces heavy crops of medium-sized fruit, which ripen to a clear pale yellow with occasional red flush. They have firm, white flesh which has a delicate flavor when cooked.

Manks Codlin is specifically recommended for baking.
