= Patronages of Saint George =

Saint George of Lydda
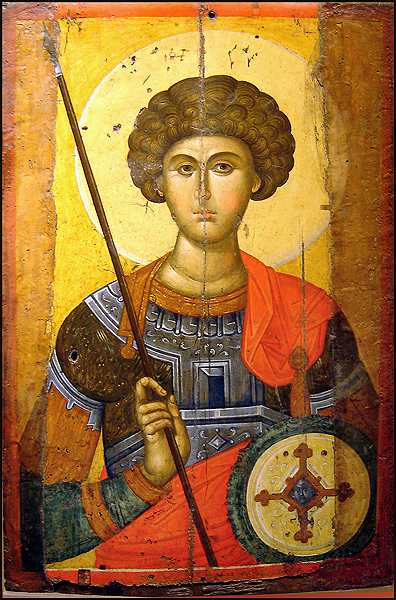
- Icon of St. George (Byzantine and Christian Museum, Athens)

Megalomartyr, Wonderworker
- Died: 23 April 303
- Venerated in: Anglicanism; Eastern Orthodoxy; Lutheranism; Oriental Orthodoxy; Roman Catholicism; Umbanda; Druze faith
- Feast: 23 April
- Patronage: agricultural workers, farmers, field workers; soldiers; archers; armourers; equestrians, cavalry, saddle makers; chivalry; peacekeeping missions; skin diseases, lepers and leprosy, syphilis; sheep, shepherds, scouting, Aragon, Catalonia, England, Ethiopia, Georgia, Palestine

As a highly venerated saint in both the Western and Eastern Christian churches, Saint George is connected with a large number of patronages throughout the world, and his iconography can be found on the flags and coats of arms of a number of cities, regions, and countries.

== National saint ==
=== Georgia ===
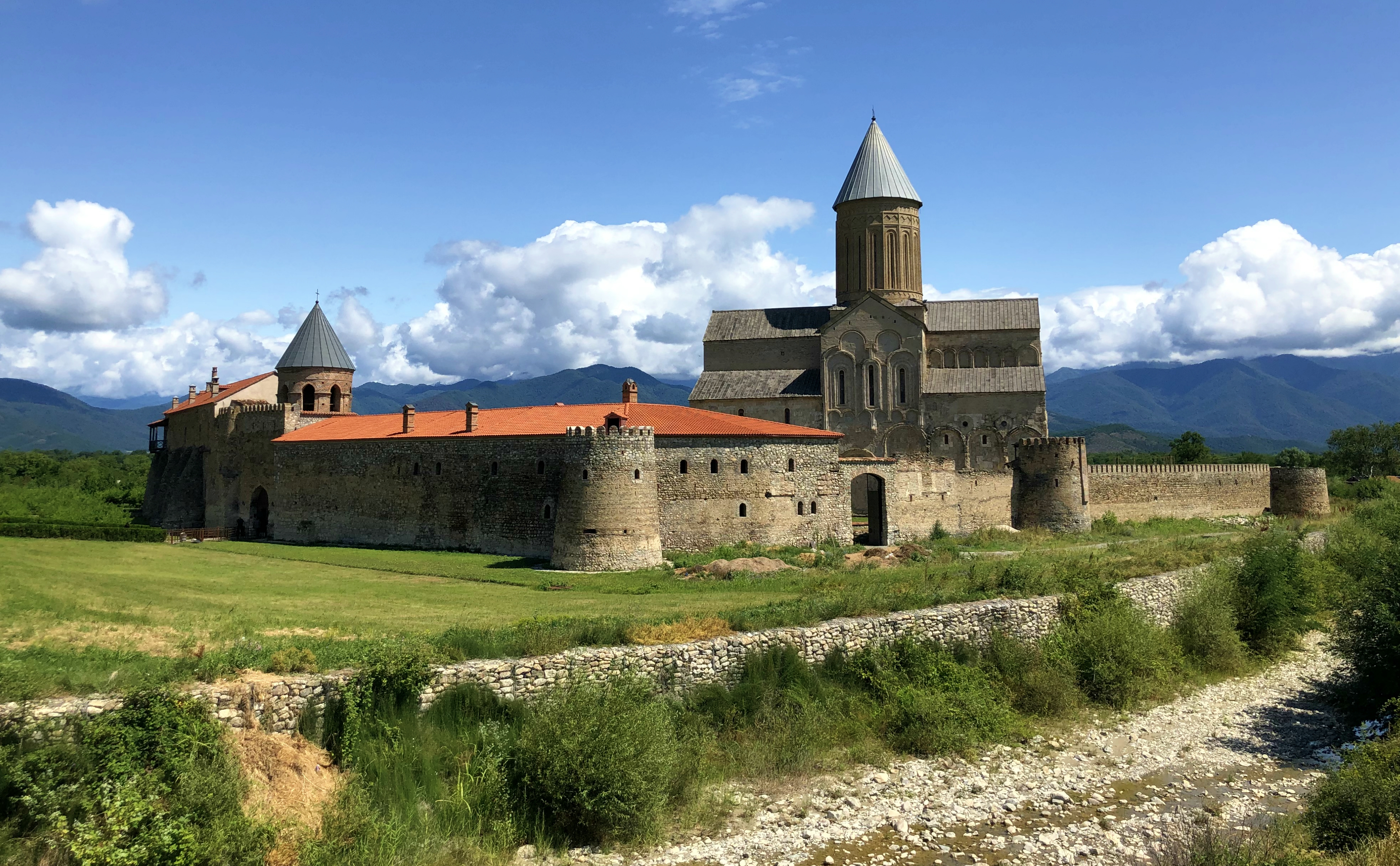
Cathedral of Saint George, part of Alaverdi Monastery in eastern Georgia.

Saint George is a patron saint of Georgia, and it is claimed that he is the most venerated saint in that nation. An 18th-century Georgian geographer and historian Prince Vakhushti of Kartli wrote that there are 365 Orthodox churches in Georgia named after Saint George, according to the number of days in one year. Of the many churches in Georgia named after the Saint, the Cathedral of St. George at the Alaverdi Monastery is one of the largest.

Devotions to the saint in Georgia date back to the 4th century. While not technically named after the saint (Sakartvelo is the Georgian name for the country), its English name is an early and well-attested back-derivation of Saint George. The terms Georgia and Georgians appeared in Western Europe in numerous early medieval annals, gradually replacing the ancient exonyms of Iberia and Iberians. The French chronicler Jacques de Vitry and the English traveler Sir John Mandeville wrote that Georgians are called Georgian because they especially revere Saint George.

The Georgian Orthodox Church commemorates St. George's Day twice a year, on 6 May (O.C. 23 April) and 23 November. The feast day in November was instituted by St Nino of Cappadocia, who was credited with bringing Christianity to the land of Georgia in the 4th century. She was from Cappadocia, like Saint George, and was said to be his relative. This feast day is unique to Georgia, and it is the day of St George's martyrdom.

"White George" on the coat of arms of Georgia

There are also many folk traditions in Georgia that vary from Georgian Orthodox Church rules, because they portray the Saint differently from the Church, and show the veneration of Saint George by the common people of Georgia. Different regions of Georgia have different traditions, and in most folk tales Saint George is venerated very highly. In the province of Kakheti, there is an icon of St George known as White George. This image is also seen on the current Coat of Arms of Georgia. The region of Pshavi has icons known as the Cuppola St. George and Lashari St. George. The Khevsureti region has Kakhmati, Gudani, and Sanebi icons dedicated to the Saint. The Pshavs and Khevsurs during the Middle Ages used to refer to Saint George almost as much as praying to God and the Blessed Virgin Mary. Another notable icon is known as the Lomisi Saint George, which can be found in the Mtiuleti and Khevi provinces of Georgia.

An example of a folk tale about St. George is given by author Enriko Gabidzashvili:

Once the Lord Jesus Christ, the prophet Elias and Saint George were going through Georgia. When they became tired and hungry they stopped to dine. They saw a Georgian shepherd man and decided to ask him to feed them. First, Elias went up to the shepherd and asked him for a sheep. After the shepherd asked his identity Elias said that, he was the one who sent him rain to get him a good profit from farming. The shepherd became angry at him and told him that he was the one who also sent thunderstorms, which destroyed the farms of poor widows.

After Elias, Jesus Christ himself went up to the shepherd and asked him for a sheep and told him that he was God, the creator of everything. The shepherd became angry at Jesus and told him that he is the one who takes the souls away of young men and grants long lives to many dishonest people.

After Elias and Christ's unsuccessful attempts, St George went up to the shepherd, asked him for a sheep and told him that he is Saint George who the shepherd calls upon every time when he has troubles and [to protect him from all evil]... The shepherd fell down on his knees and adored him and gave him everything." The tale shows the degree to which St George was venerated in Georgia, and similar tales are told in parts of Georgia today.

გიორგი (giorgi), the Georgian variant of name George, is historically the most popular given name for men in Georgia.

=== England ===
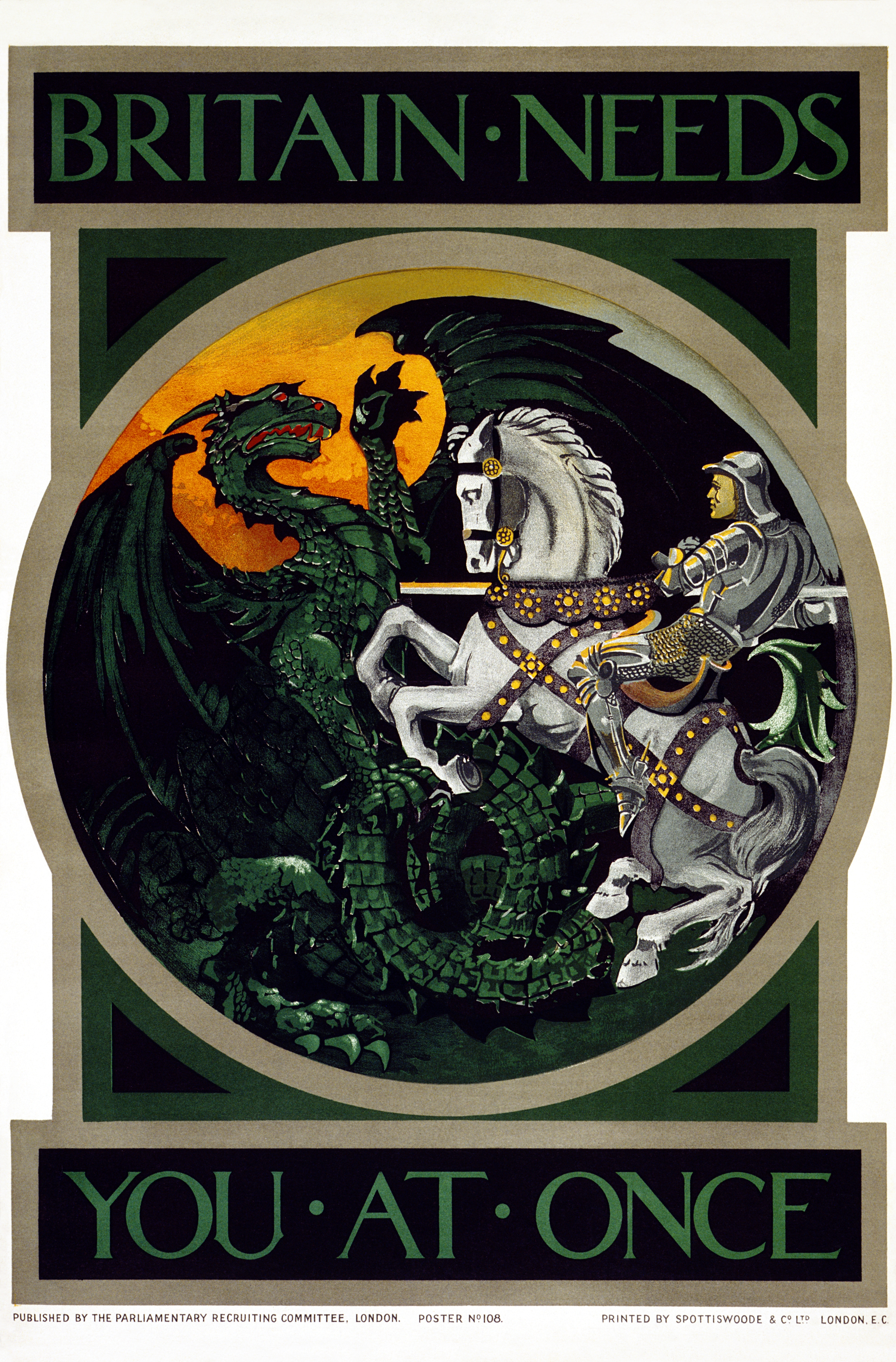
British recruitment poster from World War I, featuring St. George and the Dragon.

Traces of the cult of St George predate the Norman Conquest, in 9th-century liturgy used at Durham Cathedral, in a 10th-century Anglo-Saxon martyrology, and in dedications to Saint George at Fordington, Dorset, at Thetford, Norfolk and Doncaster. He received further impetus when the Crusaders returned from the Holy Land in the 12th century. At the Battle of Antioch in 1098, St George, St Demetrius and St Maurice were said to have been seen riding alongside the crusaders, and depictions of this event can be seen in a number of churches. King Edward III (reigned 1327–77) was known for promoting the codes of knighthood and in 1348 founded the Order of the Garter. During Edward's reign, George came to be recognised as the patron saint of the English monarchy; before this, Saint Edmund had been considered the patron saint of England, although his veneration had waned since the time of the Norman conquest, and his cult was partly eclipsed by that of Edward the Confessor. Edward dedicated the chapel at Windsor Castle to the soldier saint who represented the knightly values of chivalry which he so much admired, and the Garter ceremony takes place there every year. In the 16th century, Edmund Spenser included St. George (Redcross Knight) as a central figure in his epic poem The Faerie Queene. William Shakespeare firmly placed St George within the national conscience in his play Henry V, in which the English troops are rallied with the cry "God for Harry, England and St George," and in Richard III, and King Lear.

Advance our standards, set upon our foes Our ancient world of courage fair
St. George Inspire us with the spleen of fiery dragons...Richard III. act v, sc.3.

Come not between the Dragon and his wrath...Shakespeare. King Lear. Act I, Sc 2

A late 17th-century ballad, St. George and the Dragon, also claims St. George as an English patron. The ballad compares other mythic and historical heroes with the merit of St. George and concludes that all are less important than St. George.

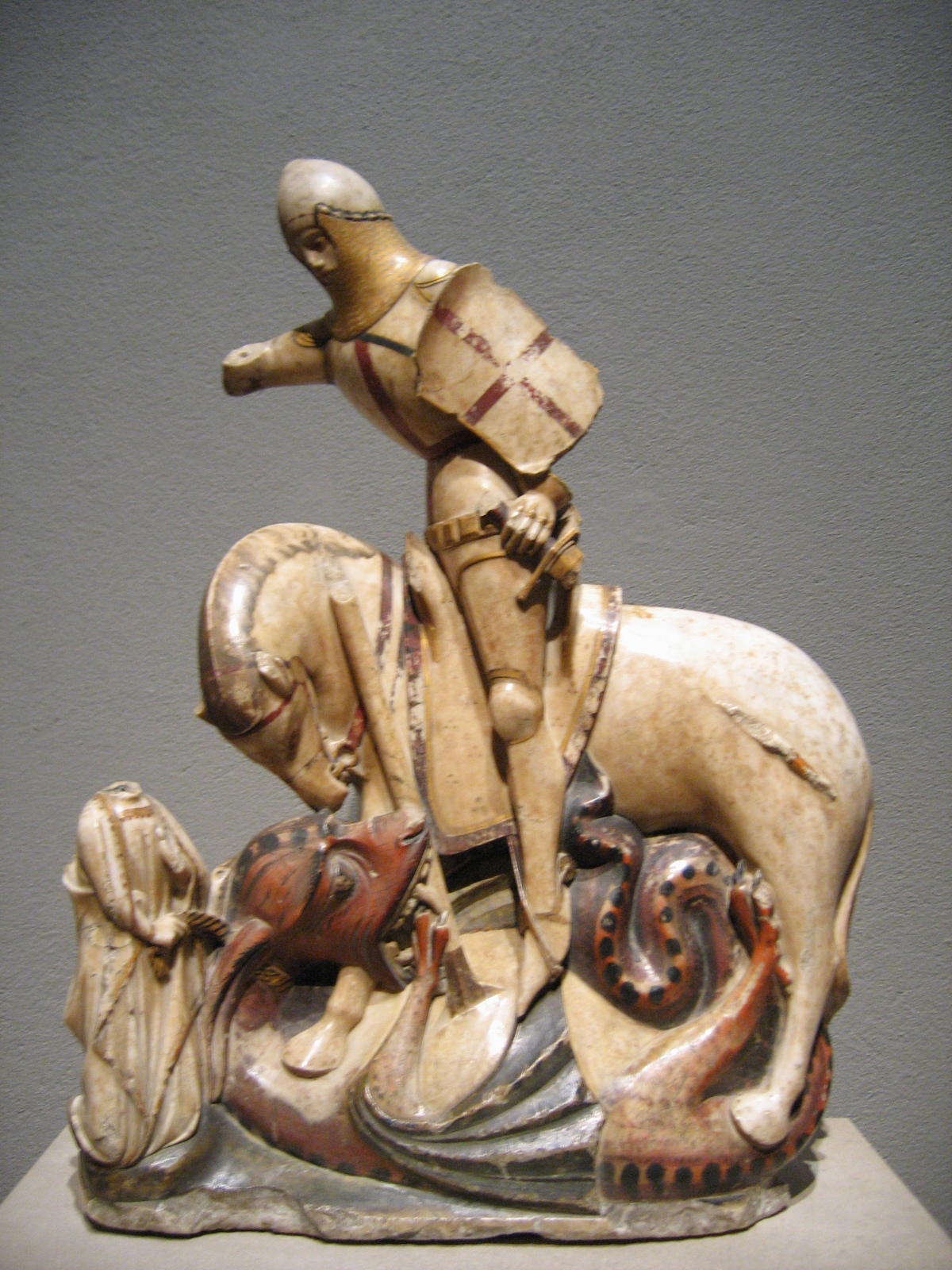
Saint George and the Dragon, tinted alabaster, English, ca 1375–1420 (National Gallery of Art, Washington)

With the revival of Scottish and Welsh nationalism, there has been renewed interest within England in Saint George, whose memory had been in abeyance for many years. This is most evident in the St George's flags which now have replaced Union Flags in stadiums where English sports teams compete. Above the Palace of Westminster, there are six shields above each of the four clock faces of Big Ben, twenty-four in total, all depicting the arms of St George, representing the Flag of England, London as the capital city of England, and St. George as the patron saint of England. This symbolism is also repeated in the central lobby of the Houses of Parliament, in an enormous mosaic created by Sir Edward John Poynter in 1869, depicting St George and the Dragon with these arms, entitled "St George for England".

St George's Day is also celebrated each year in London with a day of celebration run by the Greater London Authority and the London Mayor. The UK Houses of Parliament also celebrate St George's Day each year with a reception and other events, organised by the St. George's Day All Party Parliamentary Group, including providing every MP with a red rose to wear in his/her lapel. The Royal Society of St. George, City of London Branch hold a Banquet on St George's Day either in the Guildhall or a London Livery Hall, they also hold a Christmas Banquet at the Mansion House.

The city of Salisbury holds an annual St George's Day pageant, the origins of which are believed to go back to the 13th century.

The Order of St Michael and St George, a British order of chivalry, was founded in 1818, and partly named after the saint.

=== Ethiopia ===
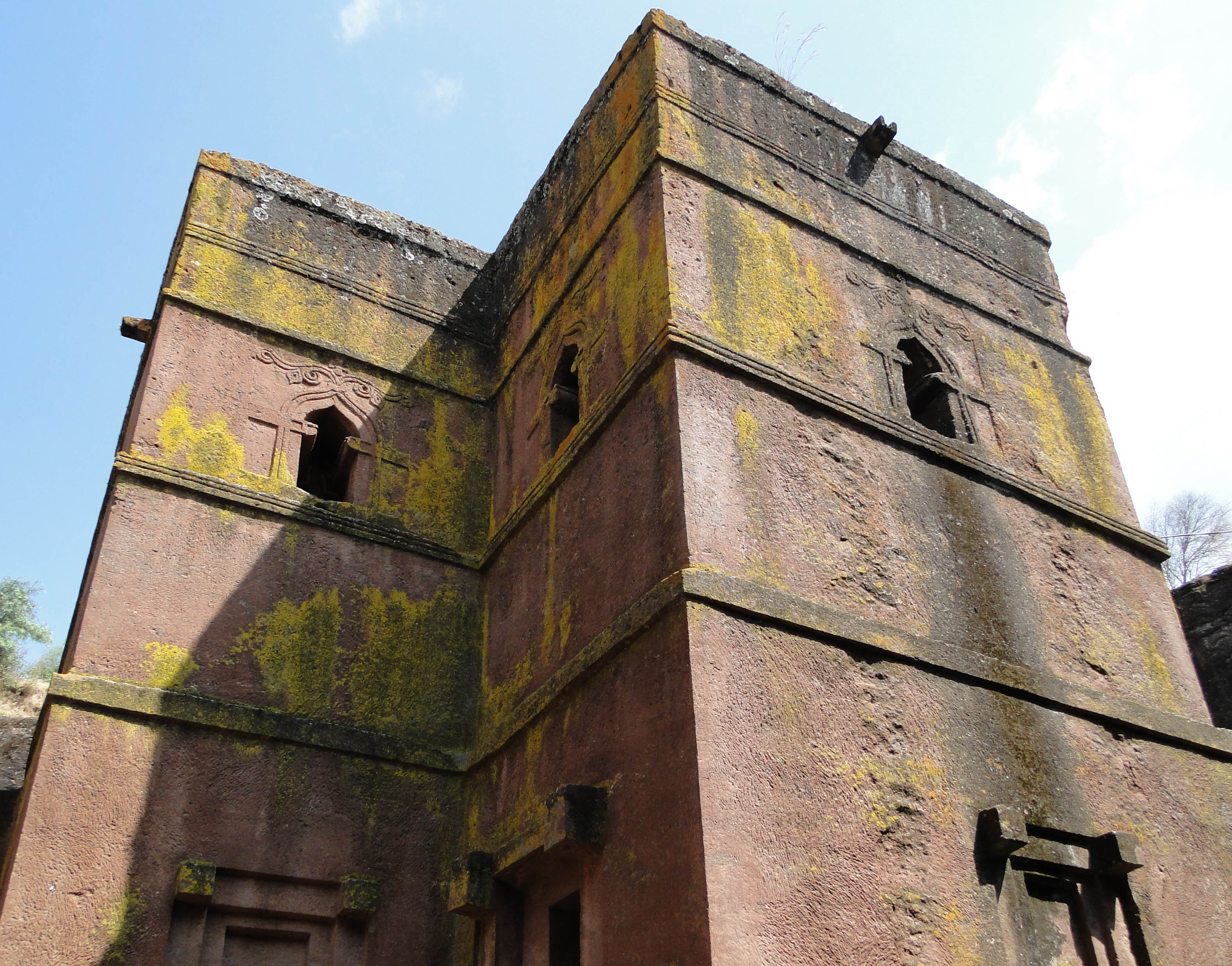
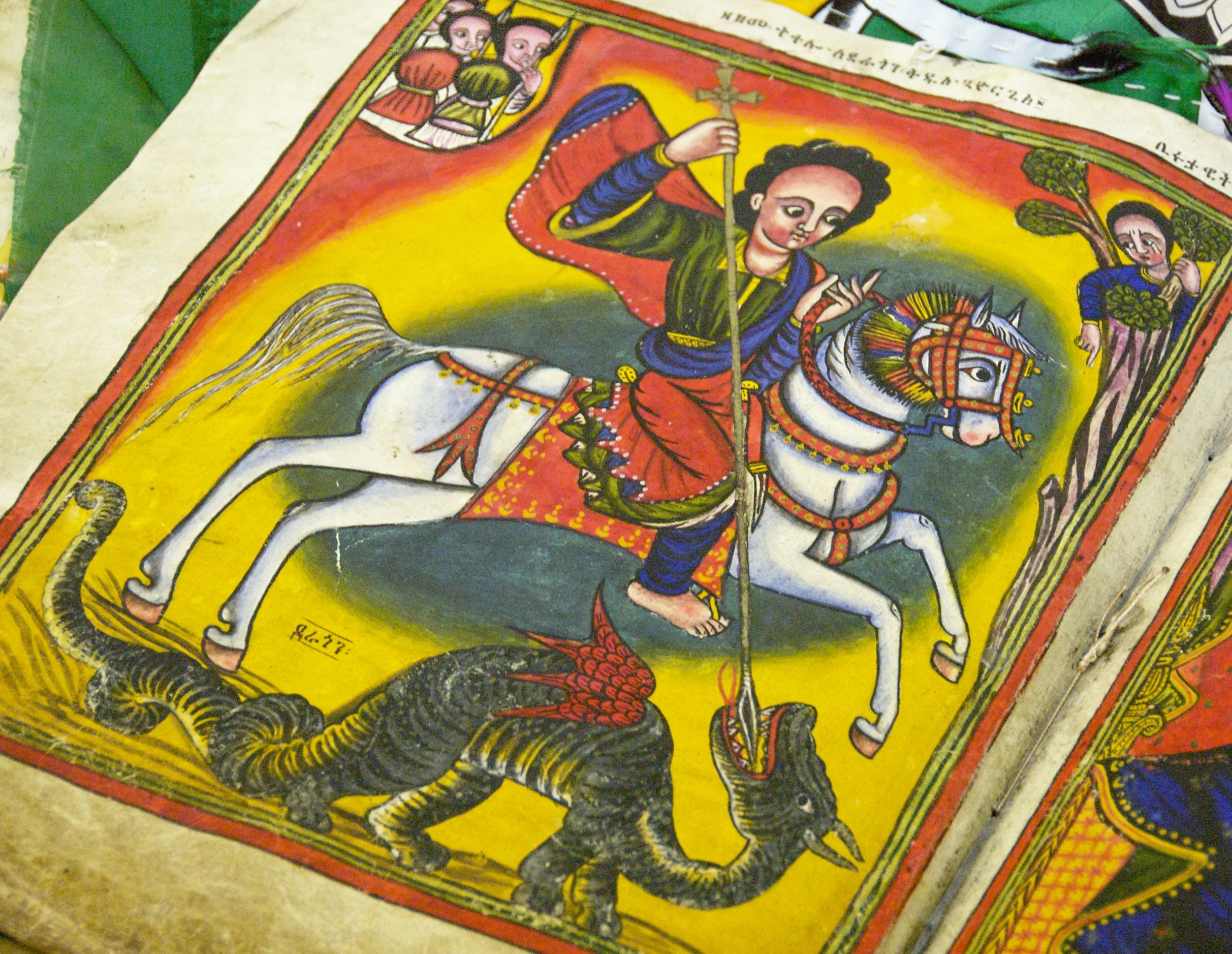
On the left, the Church of Saint George, Lalibela, one of eleven monumental rock-hewn churches allegedly built under Zagwe-dynasty ruler Gebre Mesqel Lalibela (r. 1185–1221), while archaeology reveals the religious structures to have been built between the 10th and early 13th centuries. On the right, a manuscript depicting Saint George slaying a dragon; from the Church of St. Mary of Zion, Axum (17th-18th century)

Saint George (Note: Geʽez: ቅዱስ ጊዮርጊስ, Kidus Giyorgis.) is venerated as the patron saint of Ethiopia and the Ethiopian Orthodox Tewahedo Church. His figure plays a significant role in Ethiopian religious life, national identity, and artistic traditions. Often depicted on a white horse slaying a dragon, he remains one of the most frequent used subjects in Ethiopian iconography and continues to appear on churches, coins, and national emblems throughout the country.

His veneration is deeply rooted in Ethiopian history and culture, symbolizing divine protection and national identity. During the Battle of Adwa in 1896, Emperor Menelik II reportedly invoked the help of Saint George before leading Ethiopian forces to a historic victory over Italian colonial troops. This victory, which preserved Ethiopia's independence, is often attributed to divine intervention, with Saint George being credited as having appeared on horseback on the battlefield to guide the troops. Afterwards, Menelik II commissioned the construction of St. George's Cathedral in Addis Ababa to commemorate this victory. Completed in 1911, it now stands as a national symbol of resilience and faith.

One of the most enduring tributes to Saint George is the Church of Saint George (Bete Giyorgis) in Lalibela, a monolithic rock-hewn church dating back to the late 12th or early 13th century. Commissioned by King Gebre Mesqel Lalibela, the church is carved in the shape of a cross from a single block of volcanic rock and is considered a masterpiece of Ethiopian medieval architecture. It is part of the Lalibela complex, recognized as a UNESCO World Heritage Site.

His influence also permeated Ethiopian oral tradition, songs, and proverbs as a symbol of courage, righteousness, and divine justice. Throughout the country, numerous communities recount miracles attributed to Saint George, including protection from danger, healings, and apparitions. Annual processions, especially in areas where churches are dedicated to him, reinforce his prominence as a patron and protector. Additionally, his name lives on in Ethiopia's modern cultural and public life with elements like the Saint George Sports Club, based in Addis Ababa, is the country's most successful football club and bears his name and symbol. In the commercial sphere, St. George Beer, produced by BGI Ethiopia, is one of the oldest and most popular beer brands in the country, often associated with national pride. These cultural expressions demonstrate his lasting presence in the moral and spiritual imagination of the Ethiopians.

The Ethiopian Orthodox Tewahedo Church commemorates Saint George's martyrdom on Miyazya 23 (May 1) and celebrates additional feast days, including the consecration of the first church dedicated to him on Hidar 7 (November 16). These feasts often involve pilgrimages, prayers, and fasting, and highlight the saint's spiritual role as intercessor and protector.

=== Iberia ===
==== Aragon, Catalonia, Valencia ====
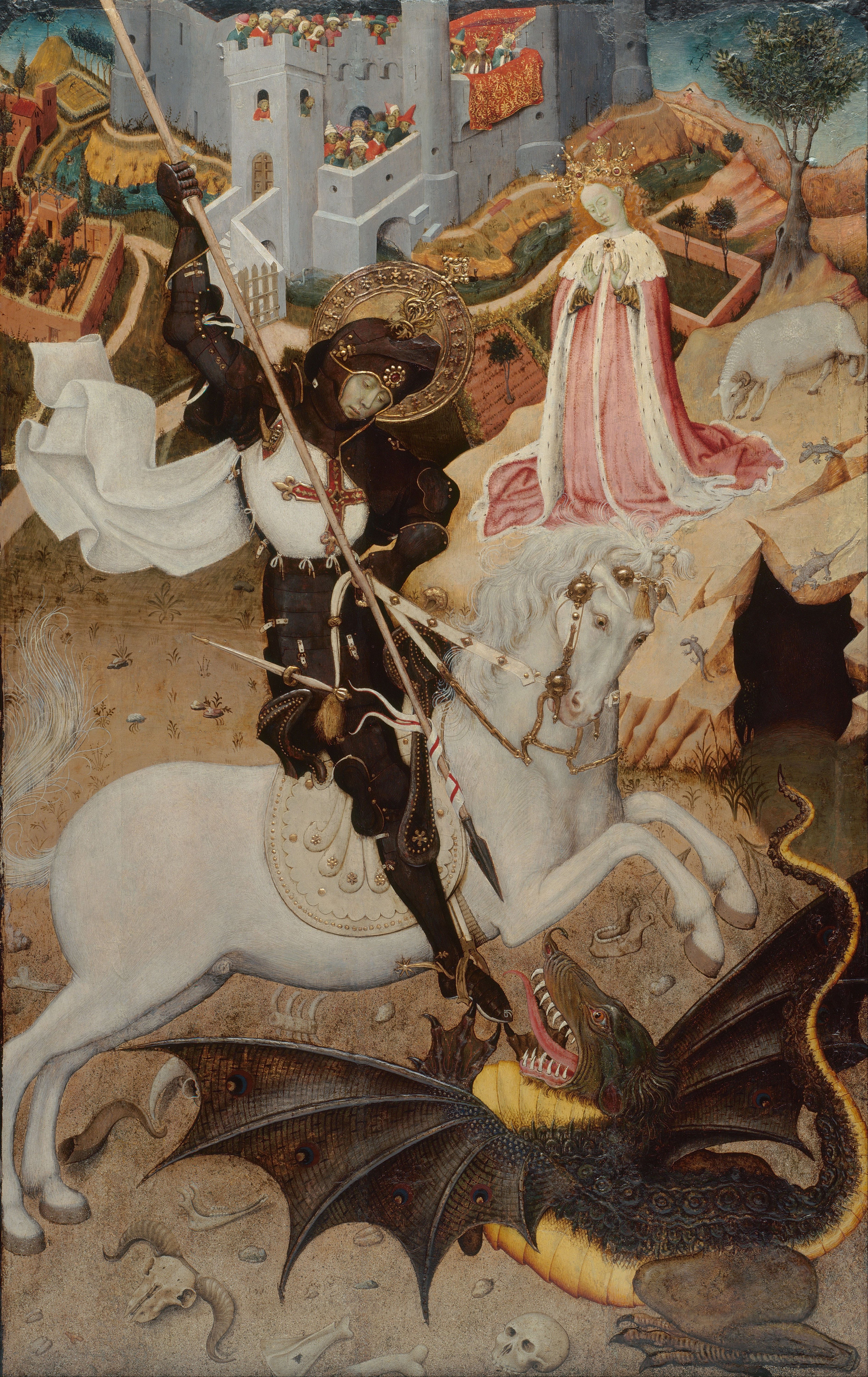
Bernat Martorell painting of Saint George, the dragon, and the princess. Commissioned by the Generalitat of Catalonia in c. 1434

In Spain, Saint George also came to be considered as the patron saint of the medieval and early modern Crown of Aragon, the territory of four current autonomous communities of Spain: Aragon, Catalonia, Valencia and the Balearic Islands. Nowadays Saint George is the patron saint of both Aragon and Catalonia, as well as the patron saint of Barcelona (see Flag of Barcelona) and other historically important Spanish towns such as Cáceres or Alcoi (Spanish language: San Jorge, Catalan language: Sant Jordi, Aragonese language: San Chorche).

His feast date, 23 April, is one of the most important national holidays of Catalonia, where it is traditional to give a present to the loved one; red roses for women and books for men. In Aragon it is a public holiday, celebrated as the 'National Day of Aragon'. It is also a public holiday in Castile and Leon, where the day coincides with the commemoration of the defeat at the Revolt of the Comuneros.

==== Portugal and Brazil ====
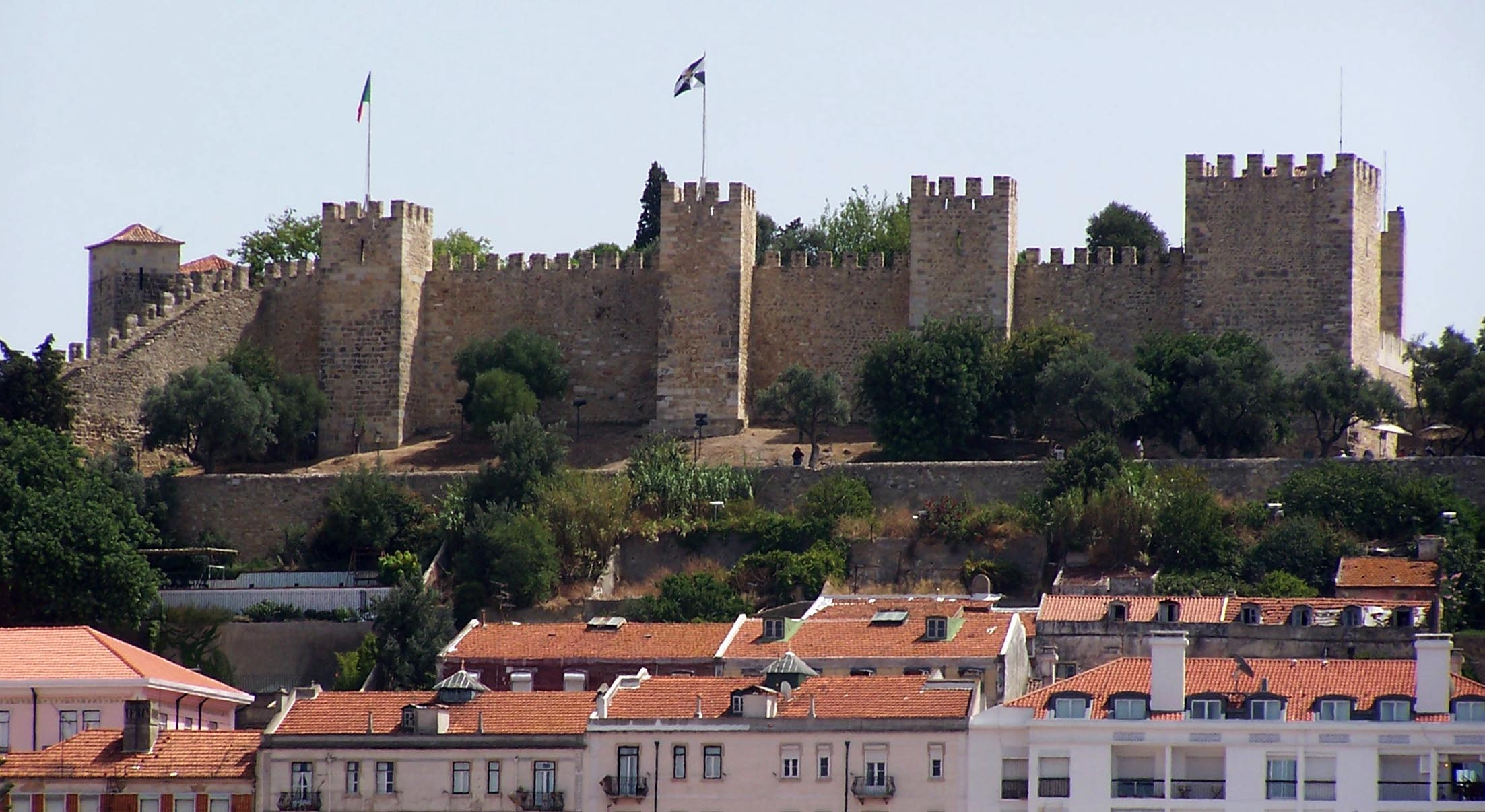
St. George Castle in Lisbon, Portugal

Apparently, the English crusaders who helped King Afonso Henriques (1109–1185) in the conquest of Lisbon in 1147 introduced a devotion to Saint George to Portugal. Nevertheless, it was not until the time of King Afonso IV (1291–1357) that the use of São Jorge!! (Saint George) as a battle cry, substituted for the former Sant'Iago!! (Saint James). Nuno Álvares Pereira (1360–1431), Saint Constable of Portugal, considered Saint George the leader of the Portuguese victory in the battle of Aljubarrota. King John I (1357–1433) was also a devotee of the saint and was in his reign that Saint George replaced Saint James as the main patron saint of Portugal. In 1387, he ordered that its image on horse be carried in the Corpus Christi procession.

As part of the Portuguese Empire, Brazil inherited the devotion to Saint George as patron saint of Portugal. In the religious traditions of the Afro-Brazilian Candomblé and Umbanda, Ogum (as this Yoruba divinity is known in the Portuguese language) is often identified with Saint George in many regions of the country, being widely celebrated by both religions' followers. Popular devotion to Saint George is very strong in Rio de Janeiro, where the saint vies in popularity with the city's official patron Saint Sebastian, both saints' feast days being local holidays.

Saint George is also the patron saint of the football club Corinthians, of São Paulo. The club stadium is Parque São Jorge (Saint George's Park).

=== Russia and Bulgaria ===
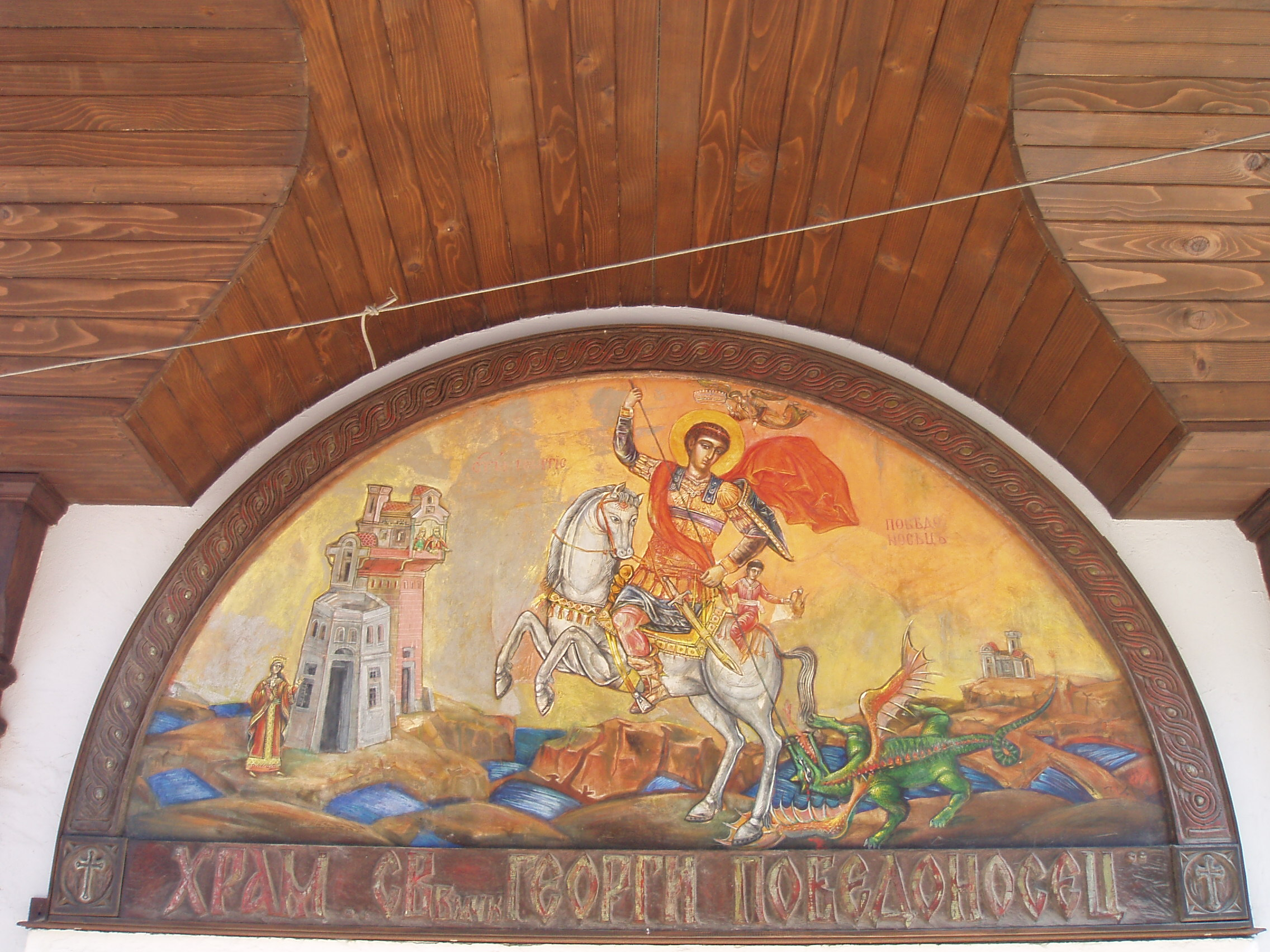
Mural above the entrance to a church in Sozopol, Bulgaria

St. George is praised by the Bulgarians as "liberator of captives, and defender of the poor, physician of the sick". For centuries he has been considered by the Bulgarians as their protector. Possibly the most celebrated name day in the country, St George's Day (Гергьовден, Gergyovden) is a public holiday that takes place on 6 May every year. A common ritual is to prepare and eat a whole lamb. St. George is the patron saint of farmers and shepherds.

St. George's Day is also the Day of the Bulgarian Army (made official with a decree of Knyaz Alexander of Bulgaria on 9 January 1880), and parades are organised in the capital Sofia to present the best of the army's equipment and manpower.

In Russia, the cult of Saint George arrived in the 11th century during the reign of Yaroslav the Wise (1010–1019). The earliest icon of Saint George is at Staraya Ladoga, in a church dedicated to him, dating from the 12th century. The cult, as in Lithuania, displaced that of a pagan deity, the sun god Dazhbog, which involved shepherds bringing their flocks to pastures. Saint George was Yaroslav's patron saint, and also that of his descendant Yuri Dolgorukiy (reigned 1149–1151 and 1155–1157), who founded what was to become the Russian capital city, Moscow, in 1156 (Yuri is Russian for George).

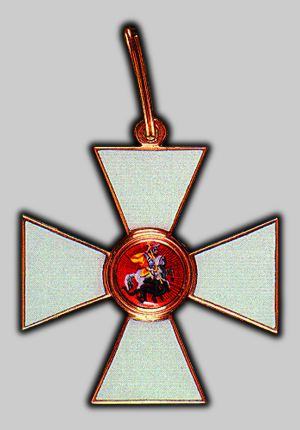
Cross of St. George, Russian imperial decoration for military heroism.

The city's coat of arms originally displayed a mounted soldier slaying a dragon. However, it was not until 1730 that Saint George was officially adopted as Moscow's patron saint, and the mounted soldier would be interpreted as Saint George. There are several statues of Saint George and the dragon in Moscow, all of which are recent, since the Russian Orthodox Church forbade sculptural representations of saints, and the Soviets discouraged religious emblems. The arms of Moscow also appears on the coat of arms of Russia, as a small shield on the breast of the double-headed eagle. Two of Russia's highest decorations are called the Cross of St. George and the Order of St. George.

=== Bosnia, Kosovo, Montenegro and Serbia ===
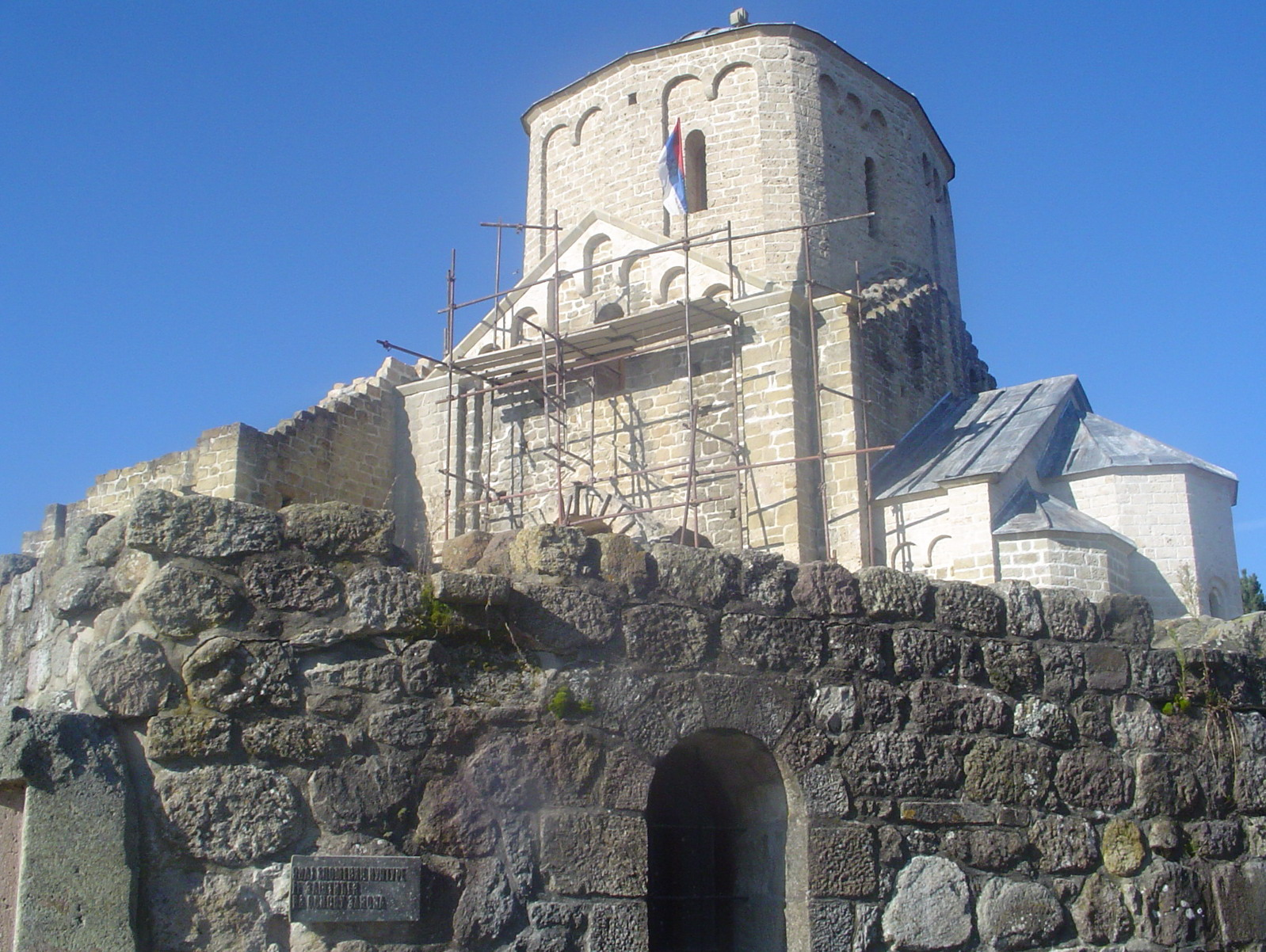
Đurđevi stupovi, Orthodox Church dedicated to Saint George, in the ancient city of Ras in Serbia. Built during the 12th century by the Serbian King Stefan Nemanja

"Đurđevdan" (Serbian: Ђурђевдан – George's day) is a Serbian religious holiday, celebrated on 6. of May by the Gregorian calendar (23. of April by Julian calendar), which is the feast of Saint George and a very important Slava. Đurđevdan is celebrated all over the Serbian diaspora but mainly in Serbia, Montenegro, Kosovo, and Bosnia and Herzegovina.

In the Serbian language, St. George is called Sveti Đorđe (Serbian Cyrillic: Свети Ђорђе).

== Churches and monasteries ==
=== Eastern Christianity ===
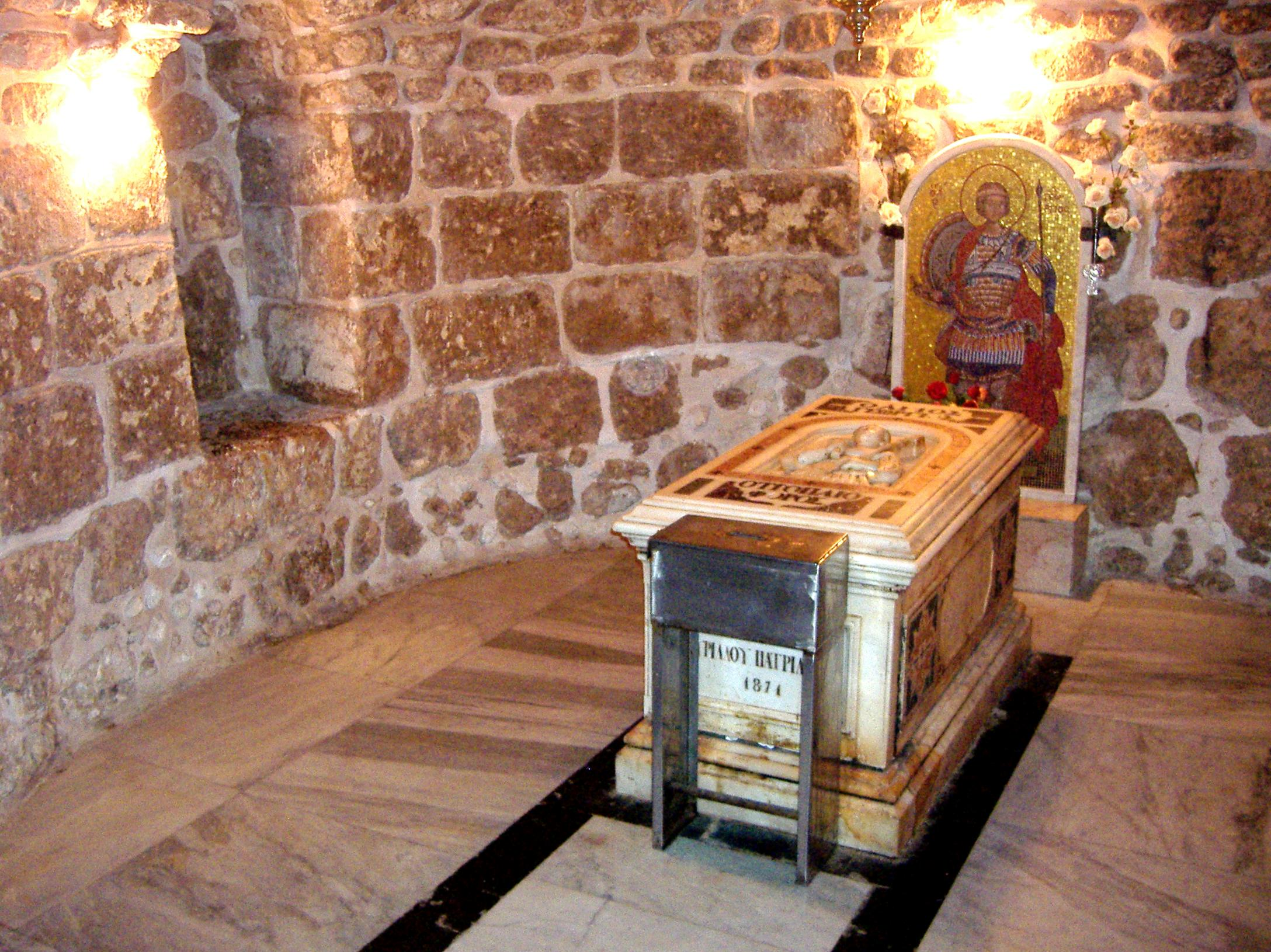
Tomb of Saint George in Lod, Israel

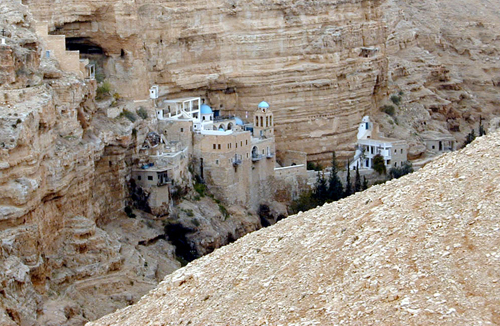
St. George's Monastery in the Wadi Qelt

Saint George is the patron saint of Lebanese Christians, Palestinian Christians, and Syrian Christians.

The 16th-century monastery known as the Monastery of Saint George is near al-Khader, Palestine. In the Wadi Qelt near Jericho stands the St. George's Monastery.

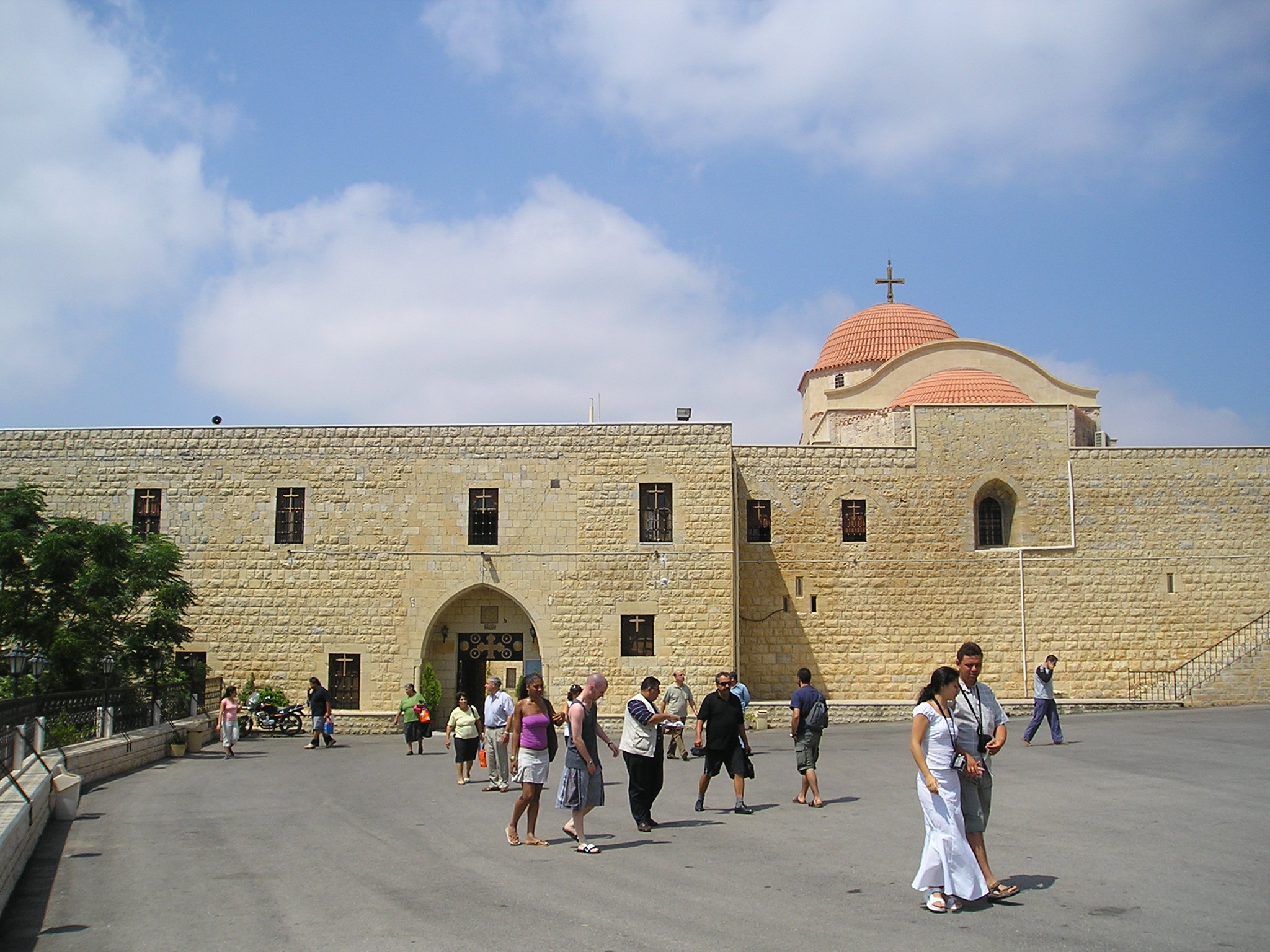
Saint George's Monastery, Homs

Saint George is among the most celebrated saints in Syria, especially among the Antiochian churches. The historical Saint George's Monastery in Meshtaye village near the city of Homs is a Greek Orthodox religious complex dating back to the 5th century. It consists of three leveled churches from the 5th, 13th and the 19th centuries respectively. The oldest one is entirely built in Byzantine style. The monastery is one of the busiest destinations for local and foreign pilgrims, mainly at the feast of Saint George and the feast of the elevation of the Holy Cross (14 September).

At Mughni (Armenia), there is a monastery dedicated to Saint George, in Armenian Սուրբ Գեւորգ (Surb Gevork). First mentioned in 1278, the monastery is said to contain relics of the saint.

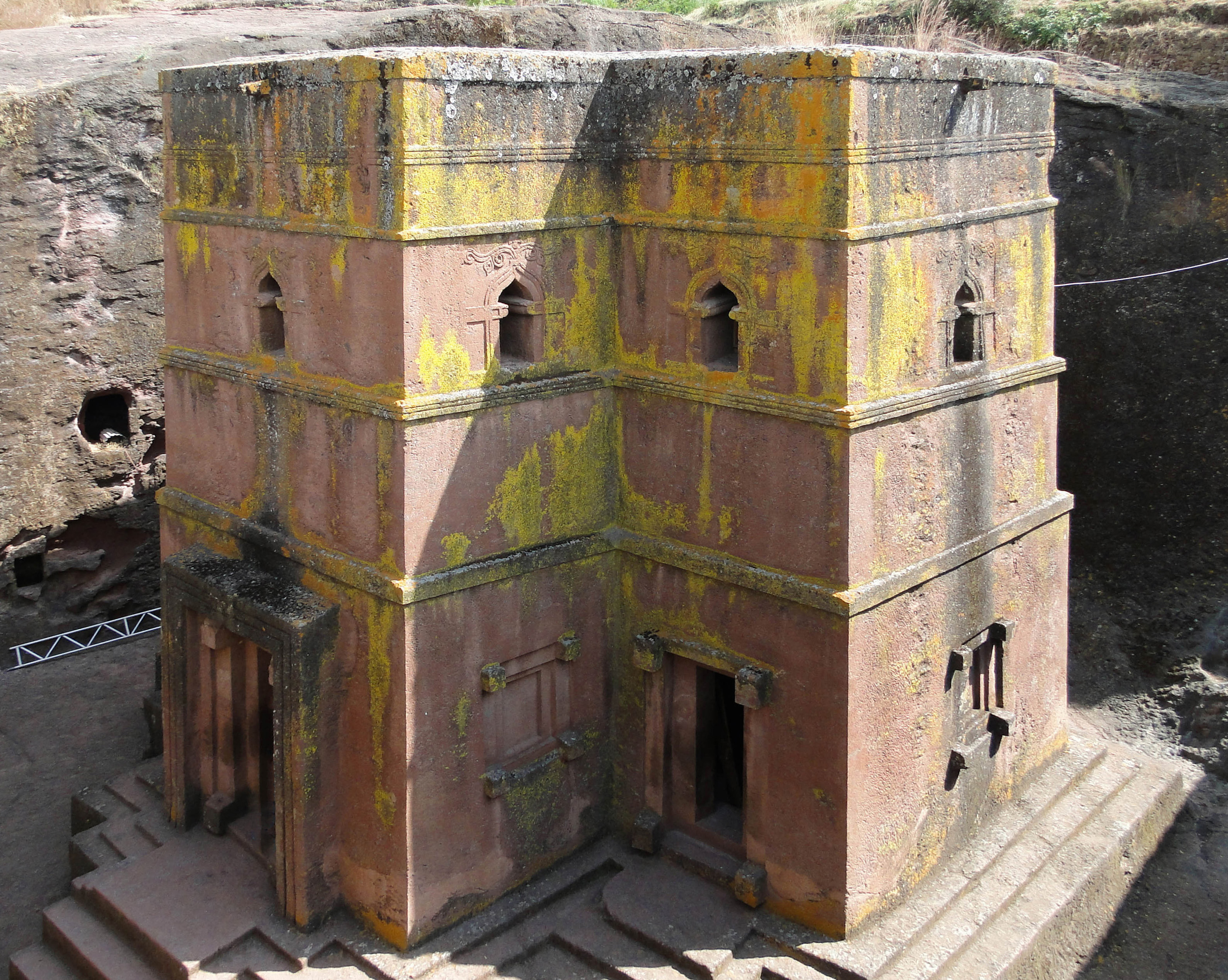
Church of Saint George in Lalibela, Ethiopia.

The Church of Saint George in Lalibela, Ethiopia dates to around 1200 AD. The church is dedicated to the saint, and is one of eleven monolithic churches in Lalibela, a holy city in Ethiopia and a site of pilgrimage. St. George's Cathedral in Addis Ababa is also dedicated to the saint, and the city's main football club is Saint George S.C. A local beer is named after the saint.

In Greece, there is a monastery on the island of Skyros devoted to the saint.

One of Montenegro's islands is called Sveti Đorđe (Serbian Cyrillic: Свети Ђорђе), where there is a monastery devoted to the saint.

=== Western Christianity ===
St George on the coat of arms of Eisenach.

Abbot Hatto (888–913) of the Monastic Island of Reichenau had a St George's Church erected, after he had received relics from the hands of Pope Formosus. The later Archbishop of Mainz made a major contribution to spread the veneration of Saint George throughout East Francia. The Georgslied, a set of poems and hymns to Saint George in Old High German was composed on Reichenau island and the scholar Hermann of Reichenau wrote a Historia sancti Georgii in the mid-11th century, which today is lost. About 1056 Archbishop Anno II of Cologne had the St George's Basilica erected, one of the twelve Romanesque churches of Cologne. About 30 years later, former Vogts of Reichenau Abbey established the St. George's Abbey in the Black Forest. Saint George was also a patron saint of the Teutonic Knights, the State of the Teutonic Order and present-day Lithuania. Emperor Maximilian I (1493–1519), the "Last Knight", chose Saint George his personal tutelar.

Notable Italian churches named for the saint are in the Province of Ragusa, in the southern part of Sicily, in the cities of Modica (whose patron is St. George) and in Ragusa. Both of them are in the World Heritage List by UNESCO.

=== Kerala ===
One of the main pilgrimages of St. George in Kerala is at Edappally (Ernakulam District), where the feast is celebrated on 4 May. Edathwa also attracts thousands of pilgrims. Angamaly Basilica is named after St. George. All these three churches are Catholic churches belonging to Syro-Malabar rite. In all Christian families in India, especially Kerala, the name George or Varghese is very popular. There are numerous churches dedicated to Saint George in India, especially in Kerala, practicing Oriental Orthodoxy, and shrines to the saint. On the banks of the Kodoor River in the district of Kottayam in Kerala, the village of Puthupally is known for its 16th-century St. George Orthodox Syrian Church. The feast of this church, held on May 6 and May 7, attracts pilgrims from all over Kerala. It is one of the largest pilgrim centers of Saint George in India, where they celebrate his feast on the first Saturday and Sunday in May. Another prominent church dedicated to St.George in Kerala is St. George Jacobite Syrian Cathedral, Karingachira (Global Georgian Pilgrim Center) of Jacobite Syrian Christian Church, established in 722 AD (Makaram 13), is one of the ancient churches of the Syriac Orthodox Church.

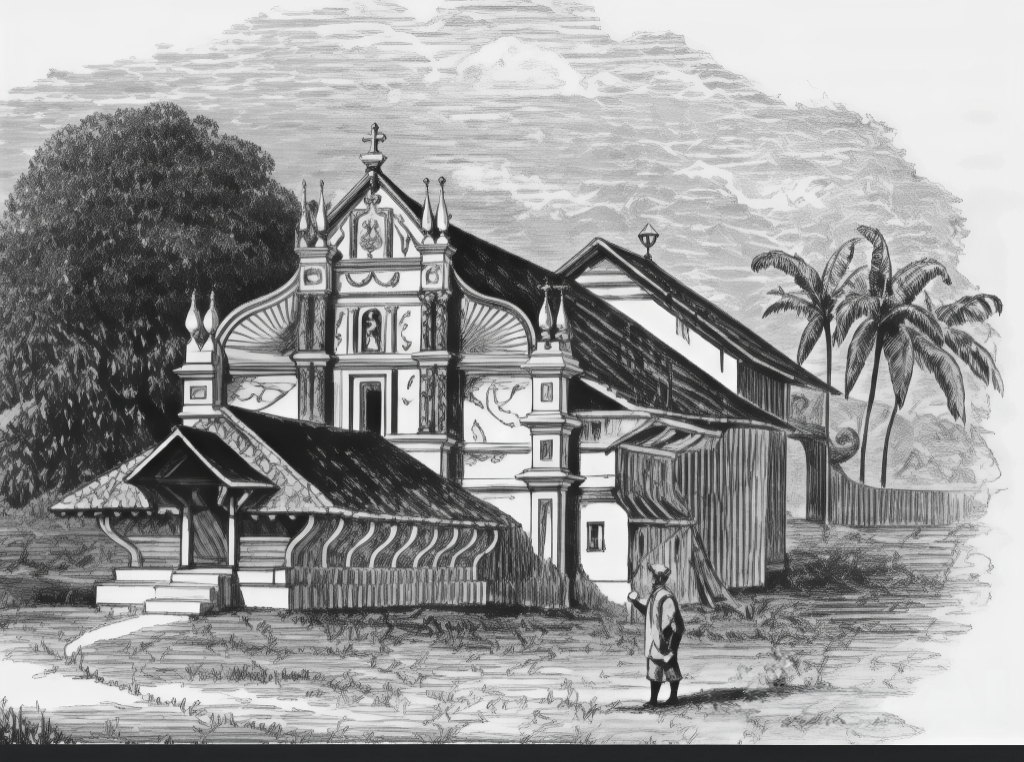
St. George Jacobite Syrian Cathedral, Karingachira which was seen by Claudius Buchanan

A Roman Catholic church dedicated to Saint George in Puthiyathura, Thiruvananthapuram district of Kerala, is also a pilgrim centre with an annual St George's Day celebration. In Tamil Nadu, Kanyakumari district, Nagercoil Town, Thalavaipuram—a famous church for St George and the people of the town—celebrates the feast of St George for ten days from the second Friday of May every year. There is also a Roman Catholic church in Aleppey, Edathua, visited by pilgrims from Tamil Nadu and Karnataka.

== Cities ==
=== Eastern Christianity ===
Saint George killing the dragon, depicted on the military flag of the Hellenic Army.

Saint George is the patron saint of Beirut, Lebanon. Many bays around Lebanon are named after Saint George, particularly the Saint George Bay, at the mouth of the Beirut River, as local tradition identifies it as the site where he killed the dragon. In Lebanon, Saint George is believed to have cleaned off his spear at a massive rocky cave running into the hillside and overlooking the Jounieh Bay. Others argue it is at the Bay of Tabarja. The waters of both caves are believed to have miraculous powers for healing ailing children. A gilded icon of St. George is kept in the Greek Orthodox Cathedral in Beirut.

Saint George is a patron of the Podgorica, the capital of Montenegro. As in Serbia, his day, known in the local language as Đurđevdan (Serbian: Ђурђевдан – George's day), is an important religious holiday. It is held on 23 April in the Julian calendar, corresponding to 6 May in the Gregorian calendar.

Saint George (Greek: Άγιος Γεώργιος) is a particularly loved and venerated Saint in Greece. He is the patron Saint of the Hellenic Army and Infantry, as well as the patron Saint of numerous Greek cities, towns and villages including Arachova, Eratyra, Goumenissa, Ierapetra, Nemea, Nigrita, Sidirokastro, Soufli, Vevi, etc., and the island of Skyros.

=== Western Christianity ===
In Mons (Belgium), Saint George is honoured each year on Trinity Sunday. In the heart of the city, a reconstitution (known as the "Combat dit Lumeçon") of the fight between Saint George and the dragon is played by 46 actors. According to the tradition, the inhabitants of Mons try to get a piece of the dragon during the fight. This will bring luck for one year to the ones succeeding in this challenge. This event is part of the annual Ducasse festival and is attended by thousands of people.

Saint George (Sint Joris) is the patron saint of the city Amersfoort in The Netherlands. It also appears on its coat of arms (Stadswapen).

Saint George is the patron saint of the German city of Freiburg im Breisgau. He also appears on the coats of arms of several German towns and cities, including Bamberg, Bürgel, Dießen am Ammersee, Eisenach, Mengeringhausen, Schwarzenberg, and, of course, Sankt Georgen im Schwarzwald. He is also a secondary Patron Saint of Marburg with a statue of George slaying the dragon in the centre of the marketplace in Marburg.

In Chennai, India, Saint George was made the patron saint of the city when Fort St. George was built, which was finished on Saint George's day. The English decided to name the fort after Saint George, who became the city's patron saint.

In Italy, Saint George is one of the Patron Saints of Genoa, Milan and Bologna as well as the patron saint of Ferrara, Reggio Calabria, Ragusa, Cellatica in Brescia, Sassuolo and Locorotondo. Saint George is also the patron saint of San Giorgio di Mantova (near Mantua) and San Giorgio La Molara (near Benevento). The historical bank that was the backbone of the Republic of Genoa, "Repubblica Marinara di Genova", was dedicated to St George, "Banco di San Giorgio". The power of the Repubblica passing from commerce to banking, Genoa lent money to all the European countries and sovereigns, so the power of the "Repubblica" was identified with its patron saint.

Two parishes are dedicated to Saint George in Malta and Gozo, the Parish of Qormi, Malta and the Parish of Victoria, Gozo. Besides being the patron of Victoria, where a St George's Basilica, Victoria is dedicated to him, St George is the protector of the island of Gozo.

In Lithuania, Saint George is the second most important patron saint, after Saint Casimir. His cult spread throughout Lithuania in the 15th century as a compromise to the former rituals to the pagan spring god Pergrubis, since his feast day in mainly Roman Catholic Lithuania, as in the rest of the Western Church, falls on 23 April. For most of Lithuania's modern history, the day was celebrated by farmers with offerings of animals in churches and the baking of special bread. Today, several Lithuanian towns, including Marijampolė, Prienai and Varniai, display Saint George on their coats of arms.

== Topical patronages ==
=== Scouting ===
Saint George defeats the Dragon in Berlin, Germany

St George's Day is also celebrated with parades in those countries of which he is the patron saint. Also, St George is the patron saint of Scouting. On St George's Day (or the closest Sunday), Scouts in some countries choose to take part in a parade and some kind of church service in which they renew their Scout Promise. In the United States, both the Episcopal Church and the Catholic Church (in both the Roman Rite and in Eastern Rites) offer a Saint George Award to adults; the Baden-Powell Scouts' Association holds St. George's Scout as their highest youth award; Orthodox Churches offer a Saint George Award to both Cub Scouts and Brownie Girl Scouts. St George is the patron saint of the Boy Scouts of America. As with many other NATO countries, St. George is the patron saint of the U.S. Army's Armor Branch.

=== Military ===
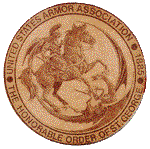
Medallion of the Order of St. George

- Patron saint of cavalry and armour branches in most Christian nations´ armed forces.
- Patron saint of soldiers and "all people protecting the nation"
- Patron saint of Greece and Cyprus armed forces.
- Specific military units, such as the United States Cavalry and United States Armor Association
  - The United States Armor Association awards the Saint George Award to tankers and cavalry troopers in a knighting ceremony.

=== Syphilis ===
He is also the patron saint of skin disease sufferers and syphilitic people.

=== Miscellaneous ===
Several United Nations (UN) peacekeepers also celebrated Saint George's Day during their peacekeeping missions in conflict-stricken countries.

== See also ==
- Saint George paintings gallery
- Saint George's church gallery
