= Molly Pitcher =

Nickname for woman fighting in the American Revolutionary War

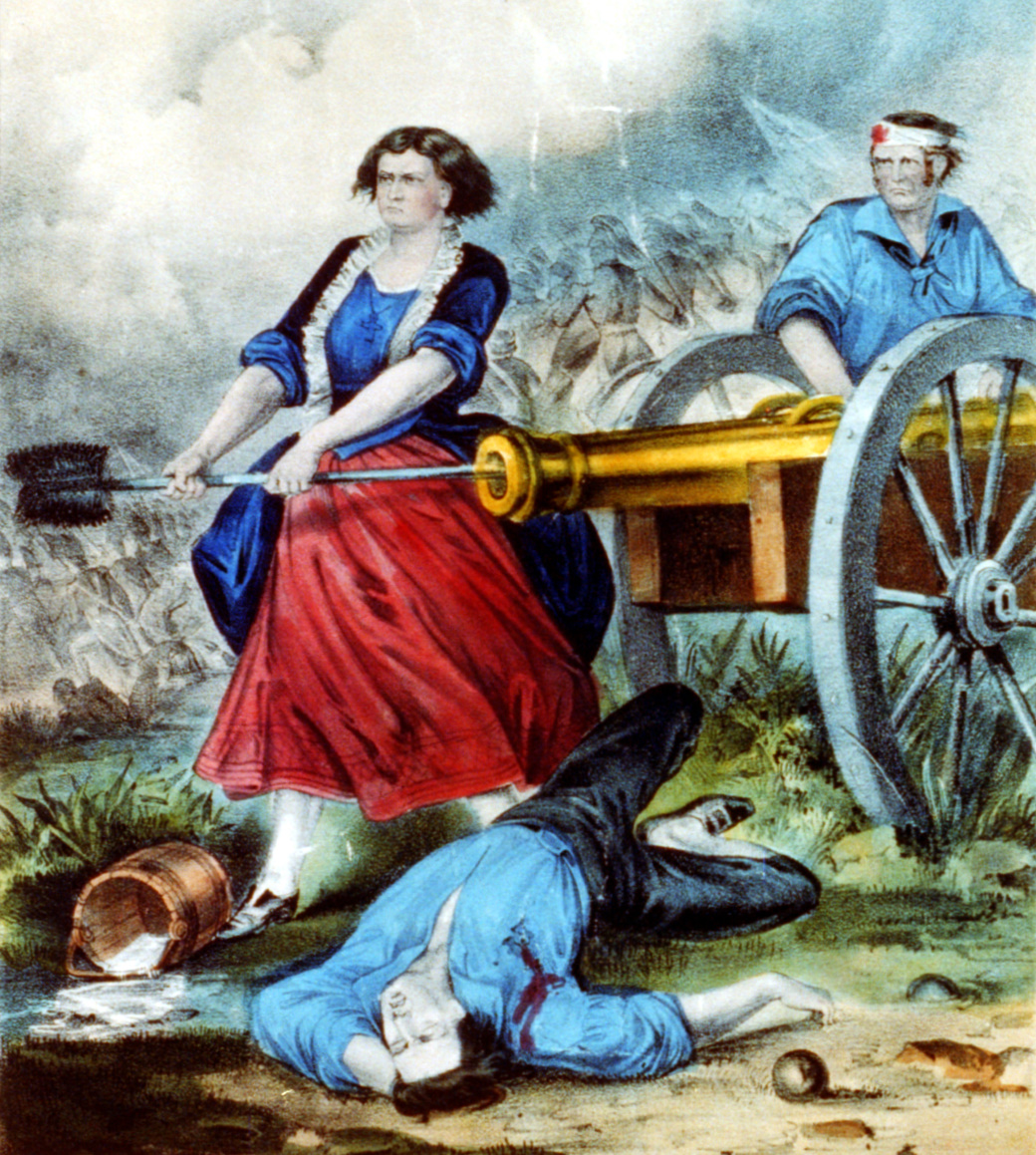
Print of Molly Pitcher (Currier and Ives)

Molly Pitcher is a nickname given to a woman who fought in the American Revolutionary War. She is most often identified as Mary Ludwig Hays, who fought in the Battle of Monmouth in June 1778. Another possibility is Margaret Corbin, who helped defend Fort Washington in New York in November 1776.

== Suggested identities ==
=== Mary Ludwig Hays ===
The deeds in the story of Molly Pitcher are generally attributed to Mary Ludwig Hays, who was married to William Hays, an artilleryman in the Continental Army. She joined him at the Army's winter camp at Valley Forge in 1777, and was present at the Battle of Monmouth, where she served as a water-carrier. Her husband fell and she took his place swabbing and loading the cannon, and was later commended by George Washington.

The incident was recorded by Joseph Plumb Martin in his memoir published in 1830.

=== Margaret Corbin ===
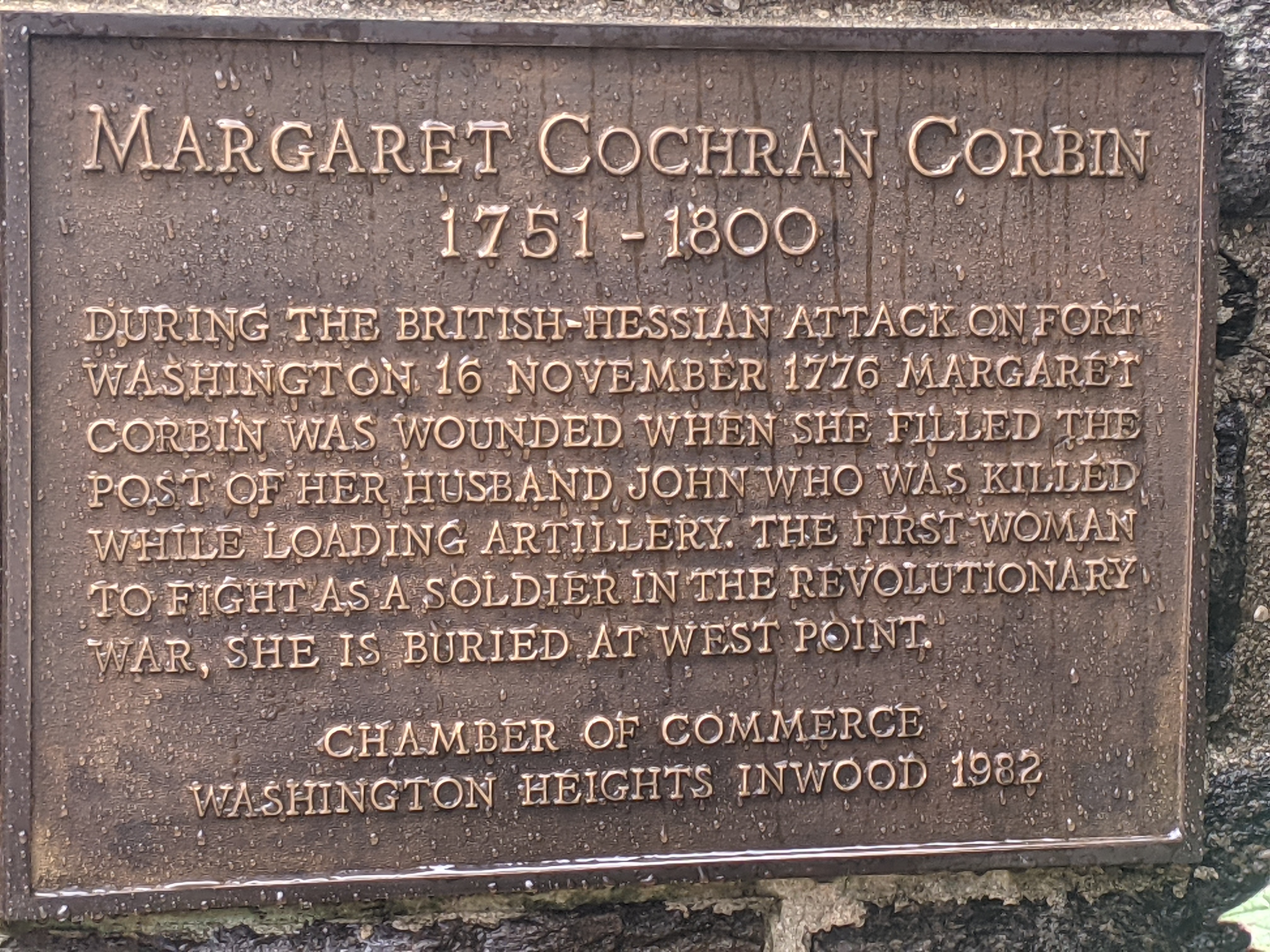
Margaret Corbin memorial, Fort Tryon Park

The story of Margaret Corbin bears similarities to the story of Mary Hays. Margaret Corbin was the wife of John Corbin of Philadelphia, Pennsylvania, also an artilleryman in the Continental Army.

On November 16, 1776, John Corbin was one of 2,800 American soldiers who defended Fort Washington in northern Manhattan from 9,000 attacking Hessian troops under British command. John Corbin was killed and Margaret took his place at the cannon. She continued to fire it until she was seriously wounded in the arm. In 1779, Margaret Corbin was awarded an annual pension of $50 by the state of Pennsylvania for her heroism in battle. She was the first woman in the United States to receive a military pension. Her nickname was "Captain Molly".

=== Deborah Sampson ===
Deborah Sampson has also been posited as an inspiration for Molly Pitcher. She disguised herself as a man and enlisted under an assumed name. Her comrades nicknamed her "Molly" because of her smooth complexion and high-pitched voice. After her discharge, she successfully petitioned for a pension as a veteran.

=== Possibly a generic name ===
Emily Teipe has suggested that "the name Molly Pitcher is a collective generic term, much like 'G.I. Joe and serves as a common label for the "hundreds, perhaps thousands, of women who served not only as ammunition wives, manning and firing the guns, but also in the army and colonial militia."

== Commemorations ==
=== Federal ===
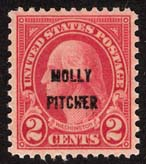
1928 Molly Pitcher stamp

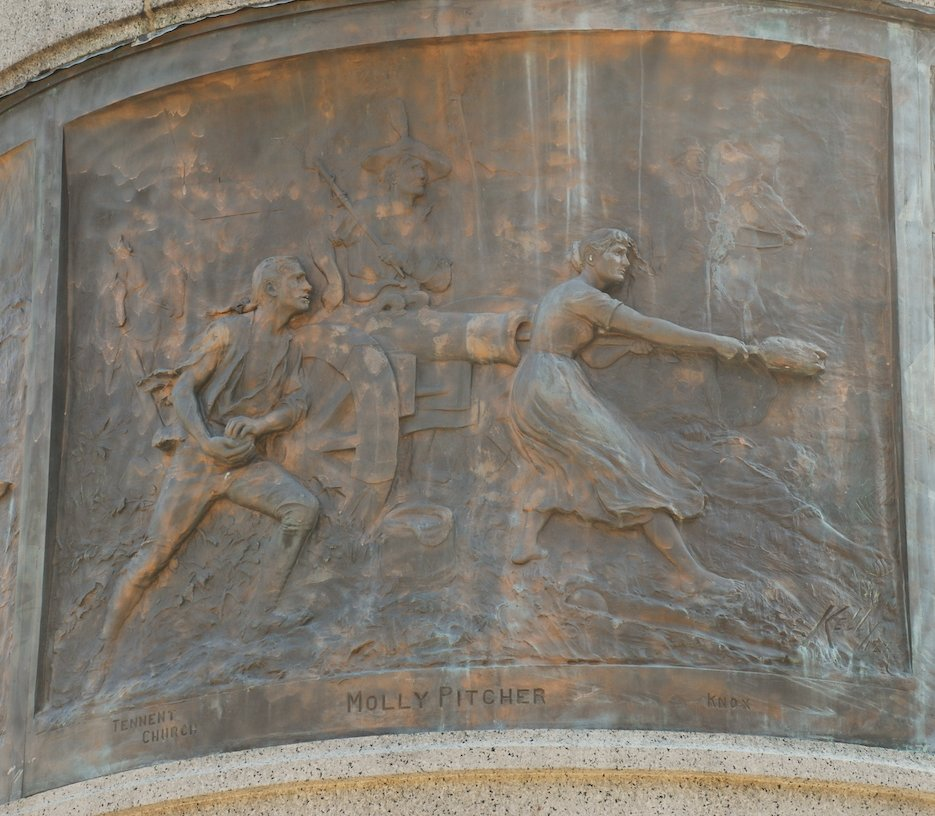
Molly Pitcher (1884) by James E. Kelly, Monmouth Battle Monument, Freehold, New Jersey

In 1928, "Molly Pitcher" was honored with an overprint reading "MOLLY / PITCHER" on a United States postage stamp. Earlier that year, festivities had been planned to celebrate the 150th anniversary of the Battle of Monmouth. Stamp collectors petitioned the U.S. Post Office Department for a commemorative stamp to mark the anniversary. After receiving several rejections, New Jersey congressman Ernest Ackerman, a stamp collector himself, enlisted the assistance of the majority leader of the House, John Q. Tilson. Postmaster General Harry New steadfastly refused to issue a commemorative stamp specifically acknowledging the battle or Molly Pitcher. In a telegram to Tilson, Postmaster New explained, "Finally, however, I have agreed to put a surcharged title on ten million of the regular issue Washington 2¢ stamps bearing the name 'Molly Pitcher.'"

Molly was finally pictured on an imprinted stamp on a postal card issued in 1978 for the 200th anniversary of the battle.

"Molly" was further honored in World War II with the naming of the Liberty ship SS Molly Pitcher, launched, and subsequently torpedoed, in 1943.

The stretch of US Route 11 between Shippensburg, Pennsylvania, and the Pennsylvania-Maryland state line is known as the Molly Pitcher Highway.

The Field Artillery and Air Defense Artillery branches of the US Army established an honorary society in Molly Pitcher's name, the Honorable Order of Molly Pitcher. Membership is ceremoniously bestowed upon wives of artillerymen during the annual Feast of St. Barbara. The Order of Molly Pitcher recognizes individuals who have voluntarily contributed in a significant way to the improvement of the Field Artillery community.

The U.S. Army base Fort Bragg holds an annual event called "Molly Pitcher Day," showcasing weapon systems, airborne operations, and field artillery for family members.

=== Other ===
- The state of Tennessee offers its women veterans a license plate honoring their service. The plate depicts Molly Pitcher, recognizing women in combat from the beginnings of the nation.
- Molly Pitcher Inn is a hotel in Red Bank, New Jersey, not far from the site of the Battle of Monmouth.
- Molly Pitcher Service Area is a rest area on the New Jersey Turnpike (I-95) in Cranbury, New Jersey.
- The Molly Pitcher Stakes is an American Thoroughbred horse race raced annually during the last week of August at Monmouth Park in Oceanport, New Jersey.
- The Molly Pitcher Club was a short-lived women's anti-prohibition organization in New York State.
- The Molly Pitcher Brewing Company is located in Carlisle, PA.
