= Honorable Order of Molly Pitcher =

The Artillery Order of Molly Pitcher is bestowed by the U.S. Field Artillery Association (USFAA) and the Air Defense Artillery Association (ADAA) to recognize wives who have voluntarily contributed in a significant way to the improvement of the U.S. Field Artillery or Air Defense Artillery Communities. The award is named after Molly Pitcher who distinguished herself during the American revolutionary war.

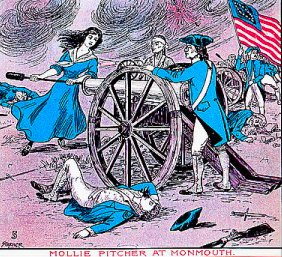
Molly Pitcher

== USFAA and ADAA awards background ==
The USFAA and ADAA processes three awards for worthy artillery men and their supportive spouses: The Ancient Order of Saint Barbara, the Honorable Order of Saint Barbara, and the Artillery Order of Molly Pitcher (ADAA) or the Artillery Order of Molly Pitcher (USFAA). Each award has specific requirements for induction.

== Nomination Process - Artillery Order of Molly Pitcher ==
The award authority for the Artillery Order of Molly pitcher is decentralized to the Field Artillery commanders, Lieutenant Colonel or above. Such commanders may approve the award for individuals in their communities. When there is no such Field Artillery commander available, the Commanding General of the United States Army Field Artillery Center at Fort Sill is the approving authority for the Artillery Order of Molly pitcher. The Artillery Order of Molly Pitcher recognizes individuals who have voluntarily contributed in a significant way to the improvement of the Field Artillery Community.

== Nomination Process - Honorable Order of Molly Pitcher ==
The nominating and approving authority for the Order of Molly Pitcher is the first FA or ADA Battalion or FA Brigade Commander in the chain of command. If no FA of ADA Battalion or Brigade Commander exists, the senior FA or ADA commander in the organization will forward the nomination to the ADA Association at Fort Bliss or the United States Field Artillery Association at Fort Sill. The packet will be forwarded to the Commanding General for review and final decision.

== The Order of Molly Pitcher Medallion ==
The Order of Molly Pitcher Medallion represents the award and induction of the woman honored. It is worn as the recipient deems appropriate and may hang from a gold chain or may be worn as a pin.
