= John Bucy III =

Texas politician

John H. Bucy III
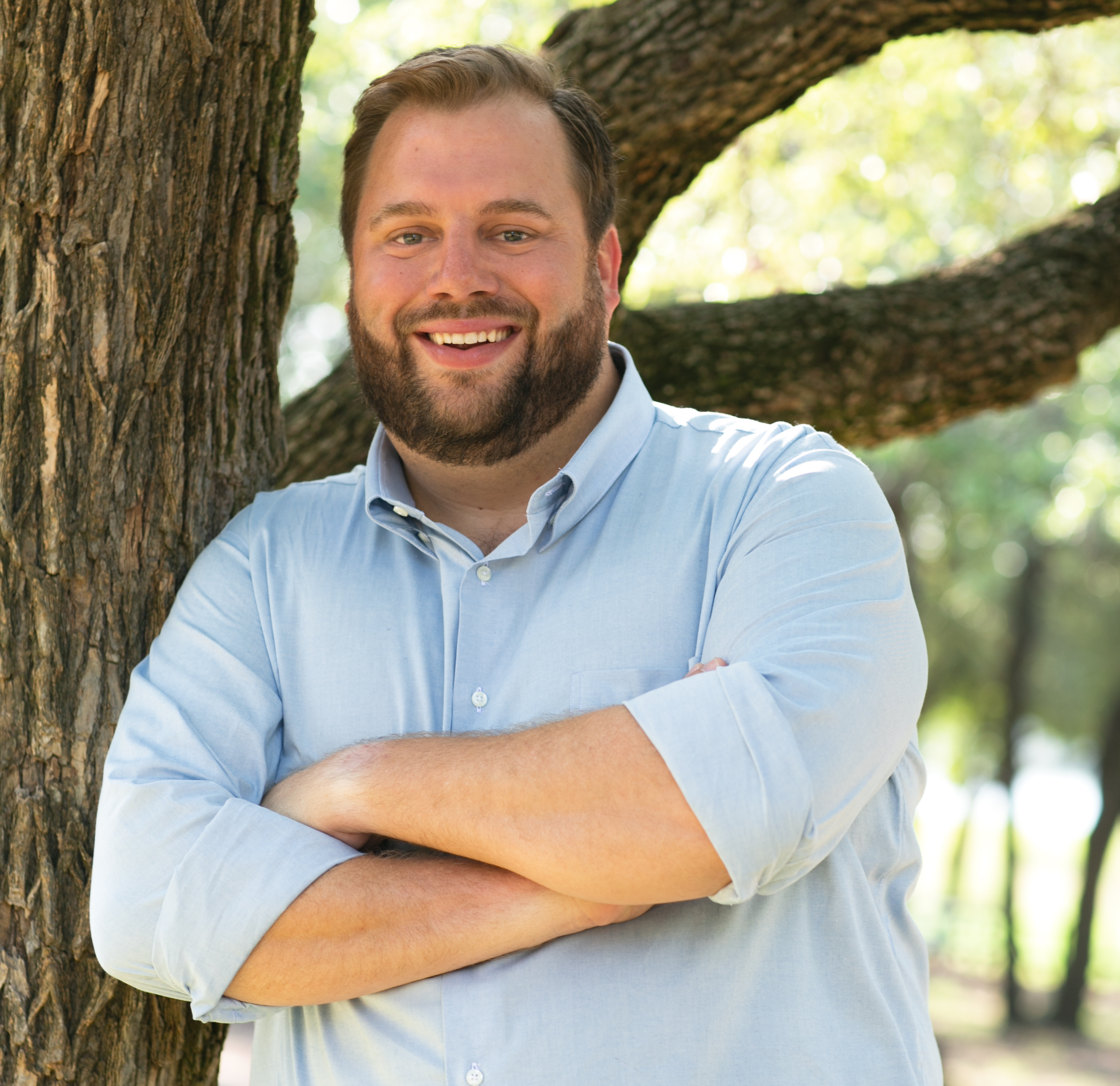

Member of the Texas House of Representatives from the 136th district
- Incumbent
- Assumed office January 8, 2019
- Preceded by: Tony Dale

Personal details
- Born: John Harden Bucy III; June 26, 1984 (age 42)
- Party: Democratic
- Children: 2
- Education: Austin College
- Occupation: Small business owner
- Website: www.bucyfortexas.com

John Harden Bucy III is an American businessman and politician serving as a member of the Texas House of Representatives for the 136th district, which includes Northwest Austin, Cedar Park, Pflugerville, Round Rock, and the Brushy Creek area in Williamson County.

== Political career ==
Bucy was sworn into the Texas House on January 8, 2019, after winning the November 2018 general election with 53 percent of the vote. He defeated incumbent Republican Tony Dale, in a re-match of their 2014 race. In 2020, he defeated Republican Mike Guevara and Libertarian Brian Elliott with 53 percent of the vote to win re-election to a second term. In 2022 Bucy won re-election by his largest margin, defeating Republican Michelle Evans and Libertarian Burton Culley with 61 percent of the vote.

Prior to his election to the Texas House of Representatives, Bucy was chair of the Williamson County Democratic Party, winning multiple city council races in Austin, Cedar Park, Georgetown, and Round Rock, as well as the first county commissioner's seat in nearly 20 years. He was elected in March 2016 and served until he resigned to run for office on December 6, 2017.

Bucy volunteered as a block captain for former President Barack Obama and as a Democratic Party Precinct Chair. He was co-founder of the Western WilCo Dems Club and served as legislative liaison for the Texas Democratic Party County Chairs Association. In 2020, Bucy was named co-chair of the Platform Committee at the Texas Democratic Party State Convention.

== Texas House of Representatives ==
As a freshman member of the 86th legislative session, Bucy was appointed to the House Committee on Elections and the House Committee on Culture, Recreation & Tourism. He was elected by his peers to be chair of the Young Texans Legislative Caucus. Bucy was honored as the Freshman of the Year by the Texas House Democratic Caucus and Best Local Elected Official as part of the Hill Country News annual Best of the Best in 2019.

In the 87th legislative session, Bucy served on the House Committee on Elections and the House Committee on Transportation. He was later named to the House Select Committee on Constitutional Rights & Remedies, where he was a key voice opposing legislation that undermined the freedom to vote. Bucy was also elected vice chair of the Innovation & Technology Caucus and appointed deputy whip of the Texas House Democratic Caucus.

In the summer of 2021, Democrats in the Texas House of Representatives, including Bucy, organized a quorum break in an attempt to stop the passage of the Election Integrity Protection Act of 2021. They flew to Washington, D.C., to lobby the Senate to pass the John Lewis Voting Rights Act and the For the People Act, which would have superseded parts of the state legislation. In 2022, the NAACP honored members of the Texas House Democratic Caucus with the Roy Wilkins Civil Rights Award, the first time the award had been presented since 1993.

In 2022, Bucy was appointed by Speaker Phelan to serve on the Select Committee for Health Care Reform, which met during the interim before the 88th legislative session. Throughout his career, he has been outspoken on the need to accept Medicaid Expansion, maternal mortality, and mental health services.

In the 88th legislative session, Bucy co-authored a bill with Republican Jeff Leach that would have expanded vote-by-mail access to people with disabilities who need assistance marking their ballot. The bill passed the House and Senate with little opposition, but was vetoed by Governor Greg Abbott over concerns that the bill would significantly expand vote-by-mail access. Bucy also passed a bill aimed at ending the practice of giving children trash bags to collect their belongings when entering or moving within the foster care system. Bucy was instrumental in stopping a bill that sought to halt Project Connect, the City of Austin’s voter-approved transit system that seeks to build new light rail, commuter rail, rapid bus, and other transit improvements across the city. Prior to a final vote on the bill, Bucy raised a procedural objection known as a point of order, arguing an amendment the Senate added to the bill changed the proposal's purpose. The point of order was sustained, which blocked further consideration of the bill.

In the 89th legislative session, Bucy introduced a bill to build a high-speed rail route between Dallas and San Antonio via Austin and to repeal a previous law prohibiting the use of public money for a high-speed rail system. The bill passed the House Transportation Committee after receiving support from three of his Republican colleagues, but was not voted on by the full House. Bucy also passed legislation to stabilize the City of Austin’s Firefighters Retirement Fund, which at the time had unfunded liabilities estimated at $300 million. The bill was the product of extensive negotiations between the Austin Firefighters Association and the City of Austin. In the state budget, Bucy secured $1 million to complete the Play for All-Abilities Playground at Springwoods Neighborhood Park, which will be designed to ensure all children can utilize the facility regardless of their physical, sensory, cognitive, or developmental abilities.

In August 2025, Bucy was one of 57 Democratic Texas House members who broke quorum to delay passage of new mid-decade congressional maps. During the quorum break, Attorney General Ken Paxton filed a lawsuit to expel Bucy and 12 other representatives from the House by declaring their seats vacant. In May 2026, the Texas Supreme Court determined it did not have jurisdiction to resolve a legislative dispute and dismissed the case.

=== Committee assignments ===
For the 89th legislative session:

- Elections (Vice Chair)
- Local & Consent Calendars
- Public Health
  - Subcommittee on Disease Prevention & Women's & Children's Health (Vice Chair)

For the 88th legislative session:

- Elections (Vice Chair)
- Health Care Reform, Select Committee
- Higher Education

For the 87th legislative session:

- Constitutional Rights and Remedies, Select Committee
- Elections
- Health Care Reform, Select Committee
- Transportation

For the 86th legislative session:

- Culture, Recreation, and Tourism
- Elections

== Personal life ==
Bucy is a native Austinite and graduate of Austin College in Sherman, Texas. He is the founder and president of TCSAAL, which provides athletic, academic, and arts competitions for charter school students across Texas. Bucy served on the regional board of the Special Olympics of Texas and is active with the Penfold Theatre. He lives with his two daughters in Northwest Austin.

== Electoral history ==
2024 general election: Texas House of Representatives, district 136
Party	Candidate	Votes	%
Republican	Amin Salahuddin	27,665	37.98%
Democratic	John H. Bucy III	45,185	62.02%

2022 general election: Texas House of Representatives, district 136
Party	Candidate	Votes	%
Republican	Michelle Evans	21,240	36.04%
Democratic	John H. Bucy III	36,137	61.32%
Libertarian	Burton Culley	1,552	2.63%

2020 general election: Texas House of Representatives, district 136
Party	Candidate	Votes	%
Republican	Mike Guevara	43,533	43.07%
Democratic	John H. Bucy III	53,887	53.31%
Libertarian	Brian Elliott	3,653	3.61%

2018 general election: Texas House of Representatives, district 136
Party	Candidate	Votes	%
Republican	Tony Dale	34,084	43.73%
Democratic	John H. Bucy III	41,592	53.37%
Libertarian	Zack Parks	2,258	2.9%
