= Noble Patron of Armor Award =

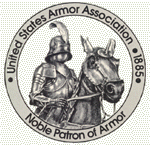

The Noble Patron of Armor award is the top award given to supporters of the Army's mounted force by the United States Armor Association of the United States Army.

== History ==
In 1986 the United States Armor Association began an awards program to honor the very best of America's tankers and troopers. The Noble Patron of Armor award program provides the mounted force with a way to recognize outstanding supporters of the Armor Force, while the Saint George Award recognizes members of the mounted force and the Order of St. Joan D'Arc Medallion is awarded to spouses selected to receive these honors.

== Recipients ==
- Major General Richard “Dick” Chegar, AUS (ret.)
- Don Stivers
- Mary Preston
- CPT Joshua D. Bourdo
- Michael Shon McGuire
- Texas State Representative Tony Dale
- SGT Trevor Hillard (Australian Army)
- MSGT Kevin B Warren, 108th Cav
- Mr. Lawrence Jaramillo OPS GRP
- SGT Keicelyn Pastores (U.S. Army)
- John P Dougherty (DA Civilian)
- SSG Joshua C. Leppo
- SSG Carmen A. Sanchez
- SFC Clinton D. Gochnour
- SSG Jeremy T. Gifford
