= Tony Dale =

American politician

Anthony William "Tony" Dale
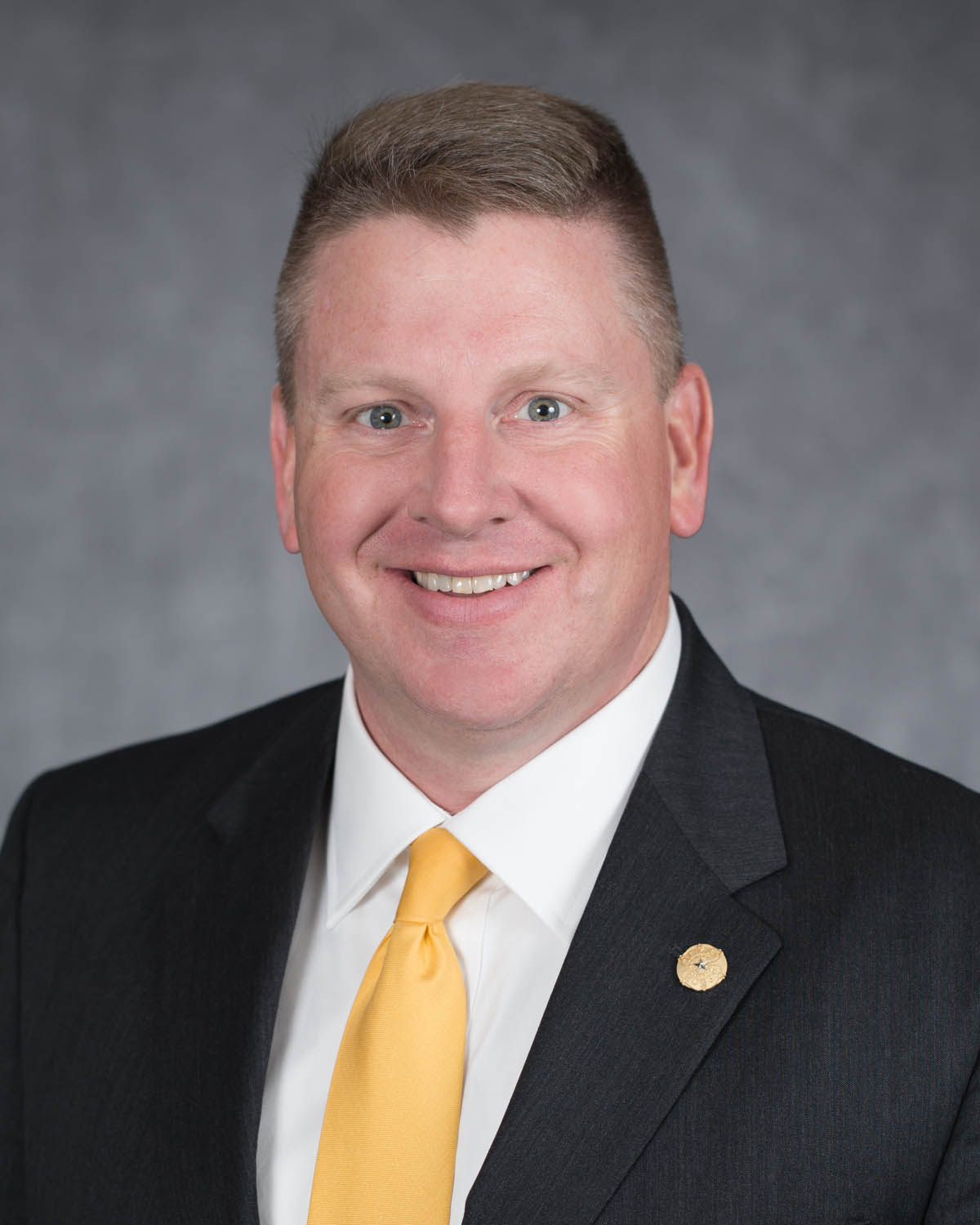

Member of the Texas House of Representatives from the 136th district
- In office January 8, 2013 – January 8, 2019
- Preceded by: Beverly Woolley
- Succeeded by: John Bucy III

Personal details
- Born: 1969 (age 56–57) Westover Air Reserve Base near Chicopee, Massachusetts, USA
- Party: Republican
- Spouse: Mary Lopez Dale
- Children: Two daughters
- Education: Ohio State University
- Occupation: Public Servant

Military service
- Branch/service: United States Army Reserves, United States Army, Texas State Guard

Anthony William Dale, known as Tony Dale (born 1969) is a public servant from suburban Cedar Park, Texas, who is a former member of the Texas House of Representatives from District 136.

First elected in 2012, Dale was reelected to successive two-year terms in 2014 and 2016. House District 136 consists of the Williamson County portion of Austin, the City of Cedar Park, the City of Leander, North Austin MUD #1 (Rattan Creek), Block House Creek MUD, Brushy Creek MUD, Fern Bluff MUD and a small portion of Round Rock.

== Background ==
Dale received a Bachelor of Arts degree in political science from Ohio State University at Columbus in central Ohio.

Dale is a US Army veteran and former Colonel in the Texas State Guard. His military decorations include the Army Commendation Medal with Oak Leaf Cluster, Army Achievement Medal, National Defense Service Ribbon, Army Service Ribbon, Lone Star Distinguished Service Medal, Texas Outstanding Service Medal with oak leaf cluster, Texas Adjutant General's Individual Award, Texas State Guard Service Medal, Texas Cold War Service Medal, Texas Humanitarian Relief Ribbon, Commanding General's Individual Award (second award), Texas Faithful Service Medal, Texas State Guard Commendation Medal, Texas State Guard Achievement Medal, Texas State Guard Good Conduct Medal, Texas State Guard Officer Professional Education Ribbon, State Guard Association of the United States Professional Development Medal, State Guard Association of the United States Distinguished Service Medal, State Guard Association of the United States Meritorious Unit Award, Basic Parachutist Badge, Master Military Emergency Management Specialist Badge and Expert Marksman Badge and The Noble Patron of Armor Award. Dale is a charter member of the Hunter-Morris Memorial American Legion Post 911 in Cedar Park. Mrs. Dale was the 2014-2015 post commander. He is a former Colonel in the Texas State Guard where his last assignment was as the Operations and Plans Officer at Headquarters, Camp Mabry. In 2021 he was inducted into the Ohio State University Army ROTC Society Hall of Fame.

The former owner of a consulting company, he serves as the Executive Secretary of the Texas Veterans Land Board. He is married to the former Mary Lopez. The Dales have been married over 35 years and they have two daughters. They attend St. Vincent de Paul Roman Catholic Church in Austin.

== Political life ==
From 2009 to 2012, Dale was a member of the Cedar Park City Council and for a year served as the mayor pro tem. Earlier, he was the secretary and later vice chairman of the Cedar Park Planning and Zoning Commission. As a member of the board of the Williamson County Conservation Foundation, he pushed for local control over federal regulations. He served too on the Cedar Park Charter Review Committee.

In 2014 Dale was unopposed in the Republican Primary. In the November 4, 2014 Dale received 20,862 (54.2 percent) and out paced his closest opponent by 13.1 percent. Democratic nominee John Bucy of Austin received 15,821 (41.1 percent) and Libertarian nominee Justin Billiot of Cedar Park received 1,811 (4.7 percent).

In the 84th Legislative Session (2015–2016) Dale served on the house committees of (1) Homeland Security and Public Safety, (2) Energy Resources and (3) Local and Consent Calendar Committee. In the 85th Legislative Session (2017–2018) Dale served on (1) Environmental Regulation Committee and (2) Vice Chairman of the Juvenile Justice & Family Issues Committee and (3) House Select Committee on Cybersecurity. He was appointed as a member of the House Working Group to reform the Child Protective Service. He was a member of the House Working Group developing internal House policies on sexual harassment.

The Cedar Park Chamber of Commerce named Dale the 2017 Citizen of the Year. In 2018 Cedar Park Mayor Matt Powell presented Dale with the city's highest civilian honor by bestowing upon him a key to the city. In 2017, 2016, 2015 and 2013 the Hill Country News reader poll voted Dale the "Best Elected Official". The Combined Law Enforcement Associations of Texas (CLEAT) named him Freshman of the Year in 2013." Following the 84th legislative session in 2015 the Combined Law Enforcement Associations of Texas named him, "Best of the House". In 2013 and 2015 the Texas Association of Business named him a "Champion For Free Enterprise".

Prior to the 2011 Egyptian Revolution he traveled to Amman, Jordan to train pro-democracy Egyptians on grassroots campaign tactics. This training was conducted on behalf of the International Republican Institute.

== Third term election in 2016 ==
Dale won his third term in the House in the general election held on November 8, 2016. With 41,643 votes (55 percent), he defeated the Democrat Paul R. Gordon, who polled 34,077 (45 percent).

== 2018 general election ==
Dale lost his bid for a fourth term in the general election held on November 6, 2018. He was unseated by the Democrat John Bucy III, who had lost the 2014 election to Dale: 41,485 votes (53.3) to 34,031 (43.8 percent). The Libertarian Party choice, Zack Parks, held another 2,253 (2.9 percent).

Texas House of Representatives
| Preceded by Beverly Woolley (from Harris County) | Texas State Representative for District 136 (Williamson County) (previously Harris County); 2013–2019 | Succeeded by John Bucy |
