= Saint George Award =

United States Army award

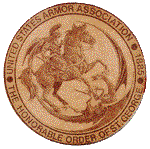

The Order of Saint George Medallion is the top award given to members of the Army's mounted force by the United States Armor Association of the United States Army. The award is issued (in increasing levels of prestige) as a black, bronze, silver, or gold medallion, depending on the recipient's eligibility. As of June 2017, a total of 76 Gold OSGs and 4 Gold NPAs had been awarded, and a total of just over 10,000 medallions of all types.

== History ==
The United States Armor Association began its awards program in 1986 and added the black medallion in 2008. It is named in honor of Saint George, who is the patron of mounted warriors and is often depicted on horseback. The Saint George Award program provides the mounted force with a way to recognize outstanding performers, their spouses (Order of St. Joan D'Arc Medallion) and Armor Force supporters (Noble Patron of Armor Award).

The Black Medallion is awarded to junior officers (lieutenants and junior captains) as well as junior NCOs (corporals, sergeants, and staff sergeants) and the very best and extraordinary performing enlisted soldiers.

The Bronze Medallion is presented to officers who have successfully completed a successful armor company or cavalry troop command (generally senior captains or majors) or officers who completed a successful armor battalion, cavalry squadron, or brigade command (lieutenant colonels and colonels). It should only be awarded once, so an officer who has a successful battalion command after receiving the award as a captain should not receive it again. The Bronze Medallion is also awarded to senior NCOs (sergeant first class, first sergeant, sergeant major) for exemplary performance as a platoon sergeant, company/troop first sergeant, or battalion/squadron/brigade/division command sergeant major.

The Silver Medallion is only presented to officers or NCOs who reach retirement (20+ years of service to the army's armor/cavalry branch) or serve beyond the branch (generally officers promoted to general officer status which has no branch) while maintaining bronze level qualification in all levels of authority. As such, this level defines the difference between the best of the professional career armor/cavalry soldiers and the best of the citizen-soldier armor/cavalrymen who were top performing leaders but do not make the army a career.

The Gold Medallion is presented as a special-level award that recognizes amazing service to the army and the branch beyond military service (if retired army) or as a civilian or policymaker. While military service can greatly enhance a nomination for this level, it is not enough of a qualification by itself. Some Gold OSG recipients include: GEN James H. Polk (#2, 1986), GEN Donn Starry (#5, 1987), GEN Bruce C. Clarke (#9, 1988), GEN William A. Knowlton (#12, 1989), GEN Glenn K. Otis (#14, 1990), GEN Michael S. Davison (#16, 1991), MG George S. Patton IV (#17, 1991), GEN Gordon R. Sullivan (#43, 2002), SMA Jack Tilley (#53, 2008), GEN Frederick M. Franks (#73, 2016), & SMA Kenneth O. Preston (#74, 2016).

== Eligibility ==
Recipients of the Saint George Award must be members of the United States Armor Association and they must be nominated by another qualified member. Black and Bronze Medallions are approved by the first qualified O-5 (lieutenant colonel) battalion/squadron commander in the soldier's chain of command. Silver Medallions are approved by the first qualified O-6 (full colonel) or above, depending on the recipient's rank and position.

== Related U.S. military association awards ==
- Order of Saint Maurice - National Infantry Association
- Order of Saint Barbara - United States Field Artillery Association
- Order of Saint Michael - Army Aviation Association of America
- Order of Samuel Sharpe - Army Ordnance Association
- Order of Saint Christopher - Transportation Corps Regimental Association
- Order of Saint Martin - US Army Quartermaster Foundation
- Order of Saint Isidore - Armed Forces Communications & Electronics Association International
- The Thomas Knowlton Award - Military Intelligence Corps Association
- de Fleury Medal - The United States Engineer Regiment

== See also ==
- Honorable Order of Molly Pitcher - U.S. Field Artillery Association (USFAA) and the Air Defense Artillery Association (ADAA)
