= Order of Saint Barbara =

American military honor society

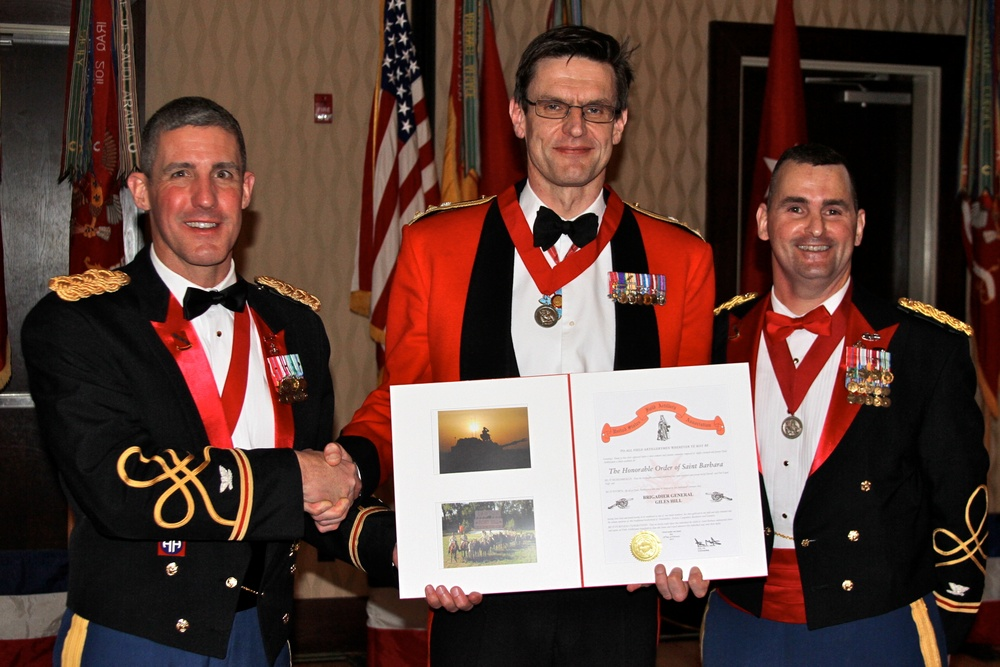
Colonel Stephen G. Smith (left) awarding the Order of St. Barbara to British Brigadier Giles Hill (center)

The Order of Saint Barbara is a military honor society of the US for both the US Army and the US Marine Corps Artillery, including Field Artillery and Air Defense Artillery.

The award is named for Saint Barbara, the patron saint of artillerymen. The Feast Day of Saint Barbara falls on December 4 and is traditionally recognized by a formal Dining-In or military ball, often involving presentations of the Order of Saint Barbara.

== Background ==
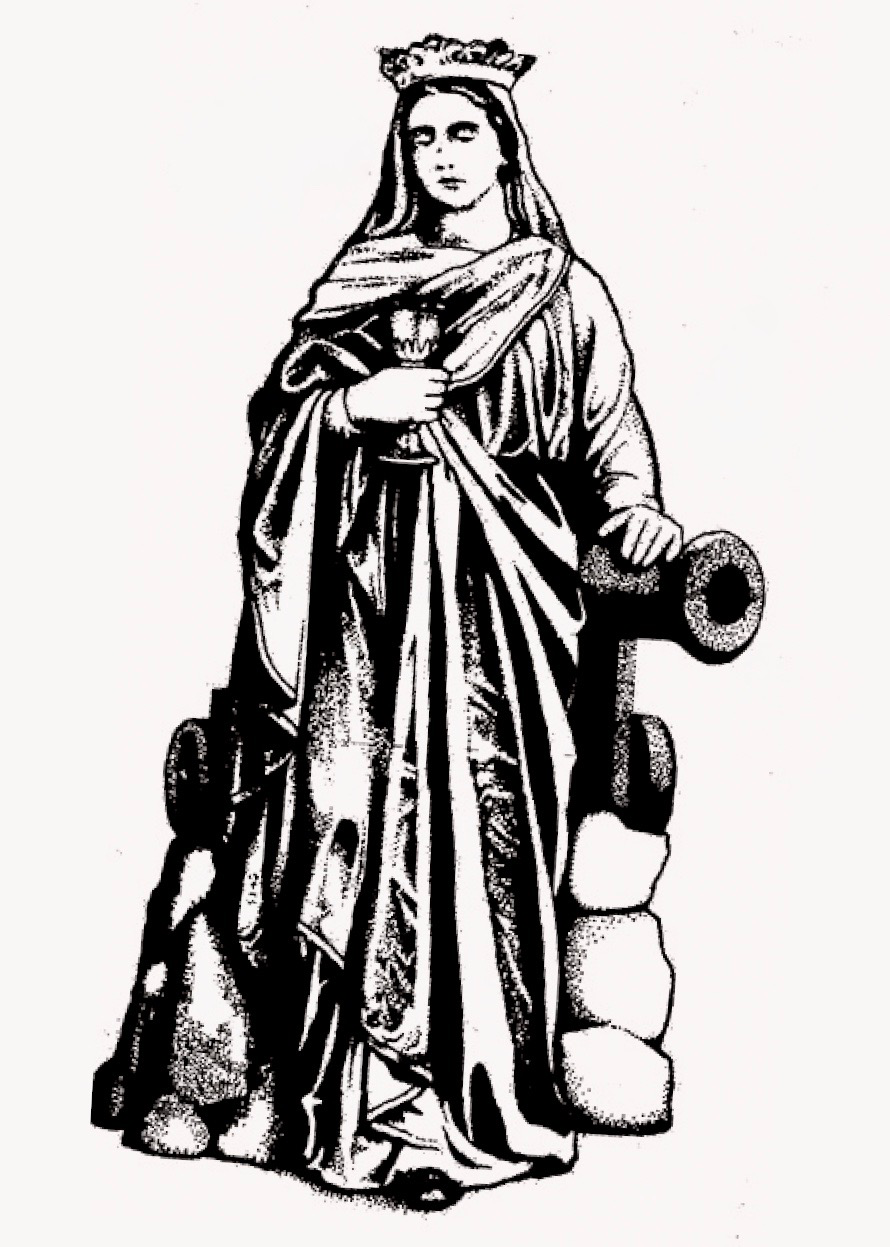
Saint Barbara with chalice and cannon

Saint Barbara, the daughter of a wealthy aristocrat, was tortured and executed after her father discovered she had converted to Christianity. Legend has it that after her father executed her, he was struck down by lightning in divine retribution. Because of this, she soon was regarded as the patron saint in time of danger from thunderstorms, fires and sudden death. She became the patron saint of artillerymen from early on in the development of artillery pieces as early cannons were unreliable, and at times would explode wounding and killing their crews. Saint Barbara was invoked by these early cannoneers in the hope she would protect them from this fate.

== Levels ==
The Order of Saint Barbara is awarded through the U.S. Field Artillery Association (USFAA) and the Air Defense Artillery Association (ADAA) and has two levels:

- The Honorable Order of Saint Barbara is awarded to those individuals who have demonstrated the highest standards of integrity and moral character, displayed an outstanding degree of professional competence, served the Artillery with selflessness; and contributed to the promotion of the Artillery branch. The approval is reserved for O-5 Field Artillery commanders when no O-6 commander is available. They may approve the award for those in or associated with their commands. When there is no such Field Artillery commander available, the Commanding General of the United States Army Field Artillery Center and Fort Sill is the approving authority.
- The Ancient Order of Saint Barbara is reserved for those members of the artillery community who have achieved long-term, exceptional service to the artillery surpassing even their brethren in the Honorable Order of Saint Barbara. The approving authority for this award is the Commanding General, United States Army Field Artillery Center and Fort Sill.

== Saint Barbara medallion ==
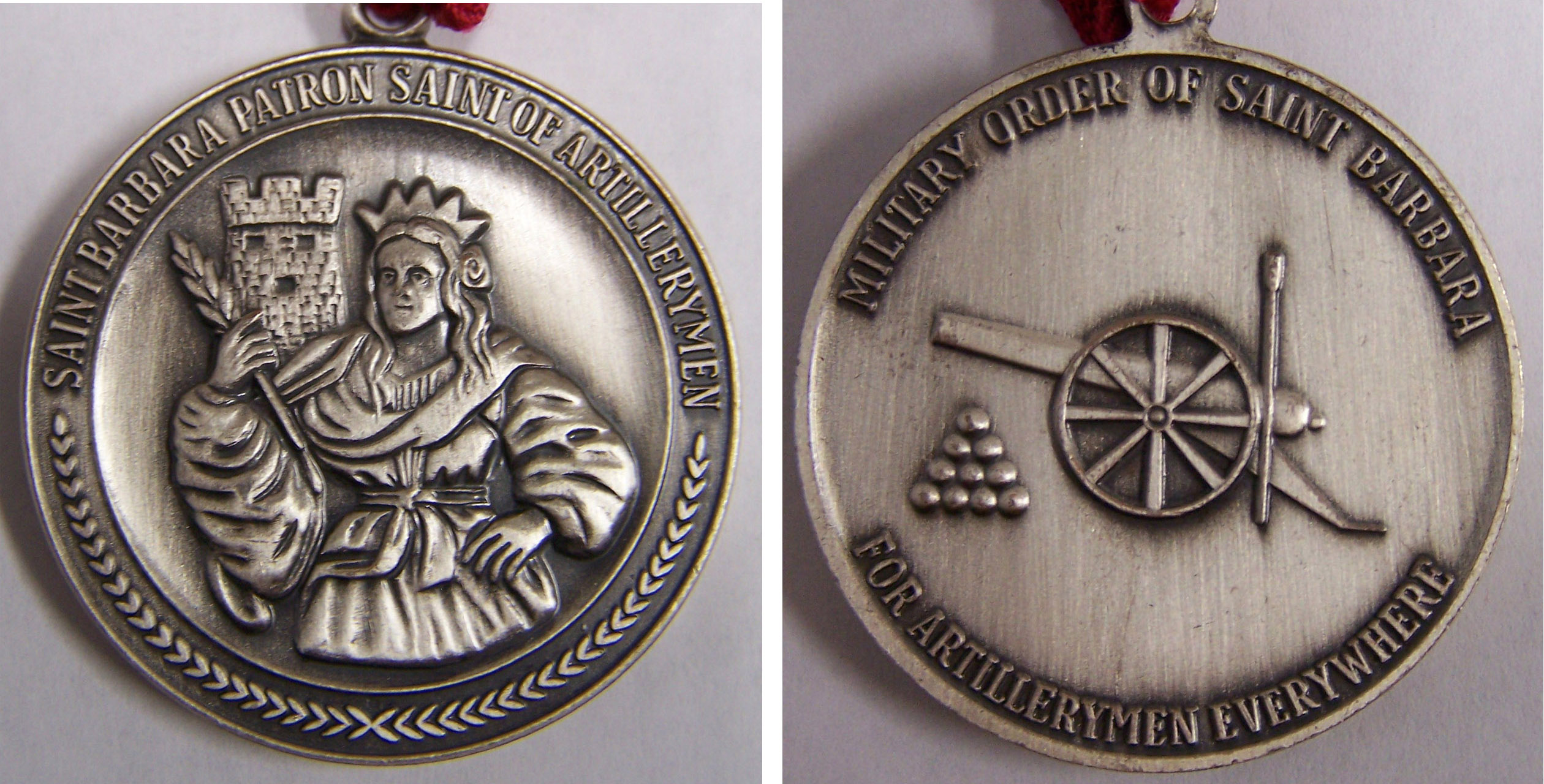
Order of Saint Barbara Medallion

Those awarded the Order of Saint Barbara receive a medallion attached to a red ribbon. The medallion for the Honorable Order is silver, the Ancient Order has a gold colored medallion. One side of the medallion has a cannon, the other a likeness of Saint Barbara standing by a tower with three windows. The medallion will be worn with the cannon side facing the chest and the bust of Saint Barbara facing out and in view. The Order of Saint Barbara should be worn only at Artillery functions such as Saint Barbara's Day celebrations, Artillery balls or Artillery dinings-in and dinings-out. Commanders, O-6 and above, may designate other occasions for wear as appropriate.

== Molly Pitcher ==
The Artillery Order of Molly Pitcher is also bestowed by the U.S. Field Artillery Association (USFAA) and the Air Defense Artillery Association (ADAA) to recognize military spouses (historically women) who have voluntarily contributed in a significant way to the improvement of the U.S. Field Artillery or Air Defense Artillery Communities. The approval is reserved for O-5 Field Artillery commanders when no O-6 commander is available. They may approve the award for those in or associated with their commands. When there is no such Field Artillery commander available, the Commanding General of the United States Army Field Artillery Center and Fort Sill is the approving authority.

== See also ==
- Order of Saint Maurice (United States)
- Order of the Spur
- Saint George Award
- Military Order of Saint Martin
- Order of St. Joan D'Arc Medallion
- de Fleury Medal
