= M. Louise Gross =

American politician

M. Louise Gross (1884–1951) was secretary to New York City Tammany Hall district leader Thomas F. Foley, a close associate of Al Smith. She served in leadership positions in repeal of prohibition organizations including the Molly Pitcher Club, the Women's Moderation Union, and the Women's Committee for Modification of the Volstead Act. Following repeal, Gross became a registered lobbyist in Washington, D.C.

== Education ==
Gross was a native New Yorker who graduated from White Plains High School before attending Fordham University where she studied law.

== Political activism ==
=== Prohibition ===
A libertarian-leaning Democrat, Gross led supporters in anti-prohibition activities through the Molly Pitcher Club, a 'wet' organization that operated within the Association Against the Prohibition Amendment and based arguments for repealing the anti-alcohol law on individual liberty.
