= Molly Pitcher Club =

Woman's anti-prohibition organization

The Molly Pitcher Club was founded in 1922 as a woman's anti-prohibition organization. They argued that drinking itself was not illegal and so the government should not get involved with a personal and private choice.

== History ==
The Molly Pitcher Club was created in 1922 by M. Louise Gross to campaign for the repeal of prohibition, which began in the United States in 1920. The organization was named after a Revolutionary War folklore heroine, Molly Pitcher. Molly Pitcher was the name given to women who carried water to men on the battlefield during the American Revolution. The stated purpose of the Molly Pitchers was to prevent "any tendency on the part of our National Government to interfere with the personal habits of the American people except those habits which may be designated as criminal."

Although they had national aspirations, the group was limited to New York and held meetings at the Ritz Carlton Hotel and Delmonico's.

In 1923 a group of 120 women from the Molly Pitcher Club arrived in Albany to urge Governor Al Smith to repeal the state prohibition enforcement measure called the Mullan-Gage Act. This march was the club's largest activity and faded quickly thereafter. Gross explained that the "activities of the Molly Pitcher Club subsided because there was nothing of importance in the prohibition field for it to do."

The club's attempt to expand its all-female membership was limited by its direct relationship to the Association Against the Prohibition Amendment, which was larger, national, and accepted both men and women.

== Sources ==
- Kenneth D. Rose, American Women and the Repeal of Prohibition, American Social Experience Series, no. 33, (New York University Press, 1966)
- Grace C. Root, Women and Repeal: The Story of the Women's Organization for National Prohibition Repeal (NY: Harper & Brothers, 1934)
