= Women's Moderation Union =

Anti-Prohibition organization

The Women's Moderation Union, headed by M. Louise Gross, was an anti-prohibition organization created to counter the Women's Christian Temperance Union's assertion that it spoke for American women. When she heard the WCTU president make that assertion before the United States Congress in an effort to enhance its power and influence, Gross decided that those women who sought the repeal of prohibition needed a vehicle through which their voice of opposition could be heard.

Although the libertarian orientation of the Women's Moderation Union did not resonate well with some women, Gross' organization was successful in mobilizing and giving visibility to many women who opposed the national prohibition of alcoholic beverages.
