= Order of St. Joan D'Arc Medallion =

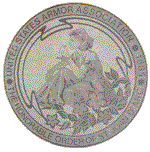

The Order of St. Joan D'Arc Medallion is the top volunteerism award given by the United States Armor Association of the United States Army.

In 1986 the United States Armor Association began an awards program to honor the very best of America's tankers and troopers. The Saint George Award program provides the mounted force with a way to recognize outstanding performers, their spouses (Order of St. Joan D'Arc) and Armor Force supporters (Noble Patron of Armor Award).

The Order of St. Joan D'Arc Medallion is conferred to honor people, generally spouses, who have voluntarily made contributions of great significance to the morale, welfare, and spirit of armor and cavalry units in the United States Army. The unit commander must compile and submit a nomination packet, which is performed without the knowledge of the potential recipient.
