= St. George and the Dragon (ballad) =

Song

"St. George and the Dragon," or "An Excellent Ballad of St. George and the Dragon" is a 17th-century ballad that considers the account of England's patron saint, St. George, and his famous defeat of a dragon. Printed on a broadside, "St. George and the Dragon" is a ballad with less of a narrative about the St. George and the Dragon episode in the Romance genre, and more of a continued assertion that St. George's defeat of the dragon is the most heroic episode in known myth or history. The collections of various libraries house surviving copies of the ballad printed on broadsides, including the British Library, the National Library of Scotland, and the Huntington Library. Online copies of the ballad facsimiles are also available.

== Synopsis ==
The ballad opens with a question: "Why should we boast of Arthur and his Knights" (line 1). The first stanza goes on to rhetorically inquire about the significance of Lancelot and Tristan, other famed Arthurian figures, before asserting that the more important tale is that of St. George. The text thus insinuates that the many legends and British writings of King Arthur, which were important to an understanding of Englishness, pale in comparison to the importance of the St. George and the Dragon legend for a sense of English identity. In the following ten stanzas, the ballad continues to follow this example, naming other famous classical of English figures known for their bravery or acts of valor before again repeating their insignificance when compared to St. George.

This ballad does not strictly follow the traditional ballad meter. While the ballad does follow a set AABBCCDD rhyme scheme, its meter is not as determined. While the lines are often in iambs, some follow iambic pentameter, others iambic hexameter, and still others break from an iambic rhythm entirely.

== Chorus meaning ==
At the end of each stanza is a repetition of a chorus. In every stanza, this chorus follows immediately upon a declaration of St. George's primacy, and it reasserts also St. George's tie to England and England's love of St. George:

St. George he was for England, St. Denis was for France,
Sing, Hony soit qui maly pence.

Literally translated from Old French as "Shame be to him who thinks evil of it," the Anglo-Norman phrase that follows England's claim of St. George modifies the avowal of St. George's greatness that each stanza makes. The line insinuates that not only was George's slaying of the dragon the greatest feat, but that it is shameful to think otherwise.

== Other people/characters mentioned in the ballad ==
=== Classical Figures ===
- Denis
- Hannibal
- Romulus and Remus
- Hercules
- Jason
- Gustavus Adolphus
- Agamemnon
- Judith
- Jove
- Cyclops
- Mark Anthony
- Sir Eglamour
- Gorgon
- Myrmidons

=== English/British Figures ===
- Henry V
- Cadwaladr
- John of Gaunt
- Saint David
- Saint Patrick
