= United States Armor Association =

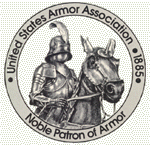
The Noble Patron of Armor Award, an award given to supporters of the Army's mounted force by the United States Armor Association.

The United States Armor Association is a nonprofit organization with over 6,000 members, dedicated to promoting knowledge of the military arts and sciences, with a particular focus on mobility in ground warfare.

== History ==
The United States Armor Association, recently renamed The Cavalry and Armor Association, originated from the United States Cavalry Association, which was established in 1885 by a small group of cavalry officers at Fort Leavenworth, Kansas.

== Membership ==
Membership in the United States Armor Association is open to anyone currently serving in the Air Force, Army, Navy, Marines, Coast Guard, as well as former members of these branches and veterans. Members receive ARMOR, the professional journal of the Army's Armor and Cavalry branch. The journal began as The Journal of the U.S. Cavalry Association in 1888 and was originally published by cavalry officers serving on the American frontier.

== Awards program ==
In 1986, the United States Armor Association launched an Awards Program to honor the very best of America's tankers and troopers. The Saint George Award program provides the mounted force with a way to recognize outstanding performers, their spouses (through the Order of St. Joan D'Arc Medallion), and Armor Force supporters (with the Noble Patron of Armor Award).
