= Prohibition in the United States =

Ban on alcohol from 1920 to 1933

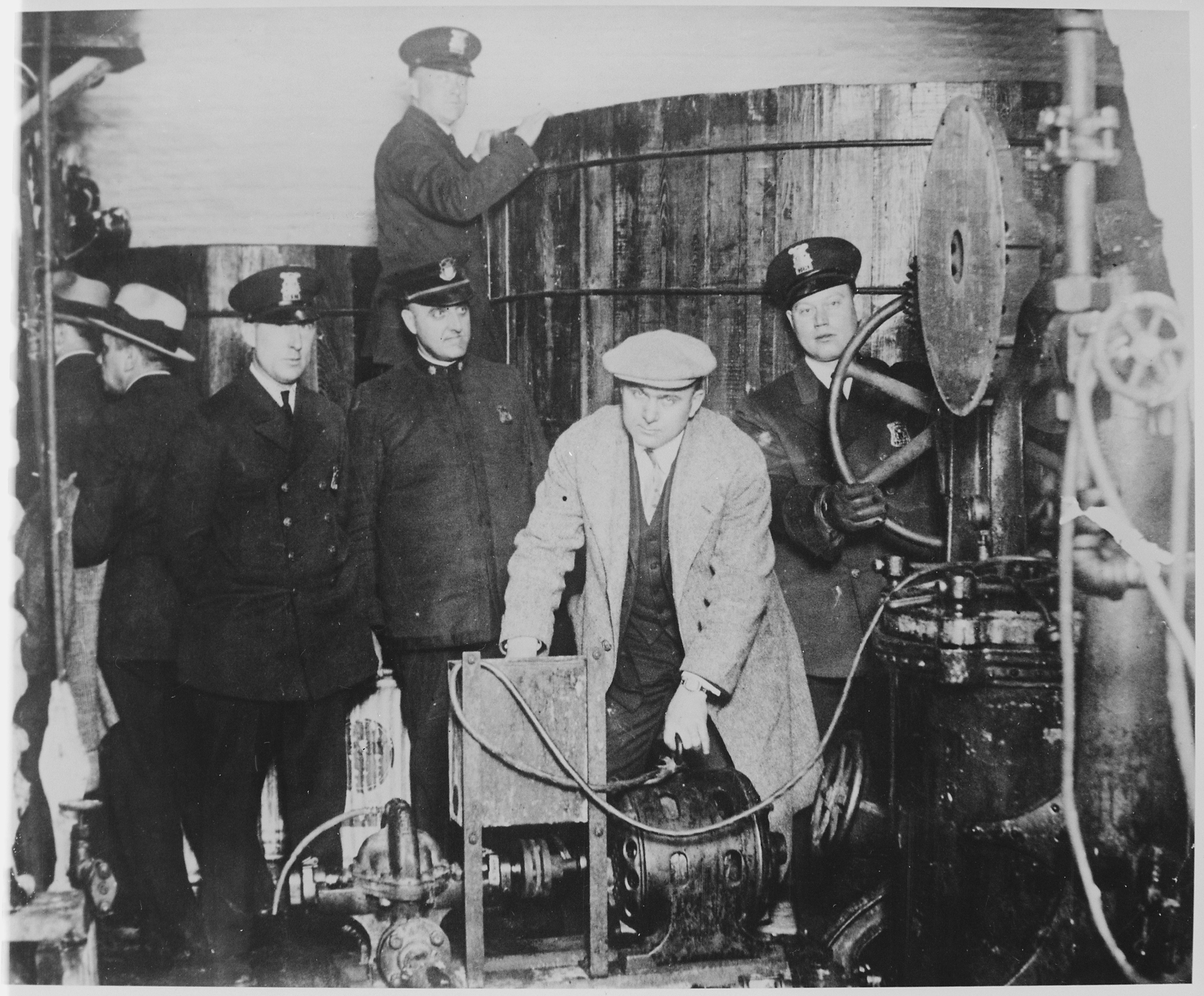
Michigan and Detroit policemen inspect the equipment used in a clandestine brewery in a bust.

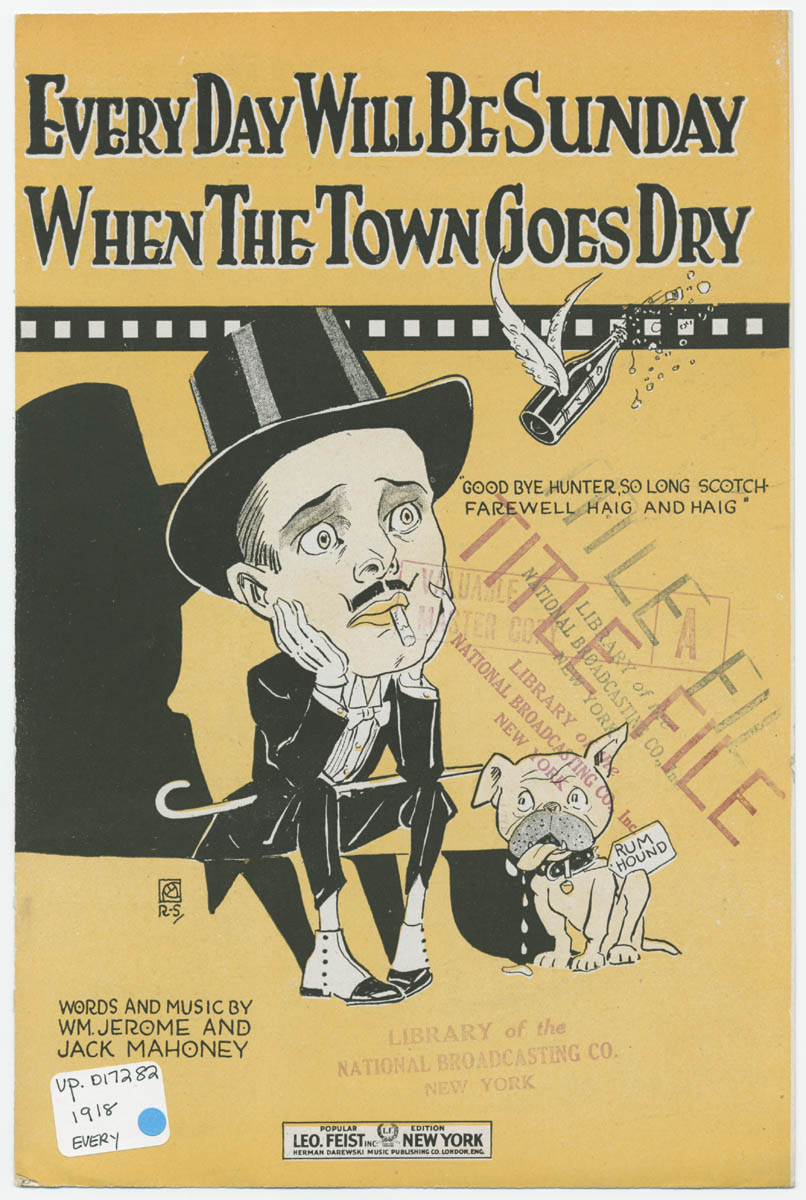
"Every Day Will Be Sunday When The Town Goes Dry" (1919)

The Prohibition era was the period from 1920 to 1933 when the United States prohibited the production, importation, transportation, and sale of alcoholic beverages for non-medical usage. The alcohol industry was curtailed by a succession of state legislatures, and Prohibition was formally introduced nationwide under the Eighteenth Amendment to the United States Constitution, ratified on January 16, 1919. Prohibition ended with the ratification of the Twenty-first Amendment, which repealed the Eighteenth Amendment on December 5, 1933.

A wide coalition composed of mostly Protestants, prohibitionists first attempted to end the trade in alcoholic drinks during the 19th century. They aimed to heal what they saw as an ill society beset by alcohol-related problems such as alcoholism, domestic violence, and saloon-based political corruption. Many communities introduced alcohol bans in the late 19th and early 20th centuries, and enforcement of these new prohibition laws became a topic of debate. Prohibition supporters, called "drys", presented it as a battle for public morals and health. The movement was taken up by progressives in the Prohibition, Democratic, and Republican parties, and gained a national grassroots base through the Woman's Christian Temperance Union. After 1900, it was coordinated by the Anti-Saloon League. Opposition from the beer industry mobilized "wet" supporters from the wealthy Catholic and German Lutheran communities, but the influence of these groups receded from 1917 following the entry of the U.S. into the First World War against Germany.

The Eighteenth Amendment passed in 1919 "with a 68 percent supermajority in the House of Representatives and 76 percent support in the Senate" and was ratified by 46 out of 48 states. Enabling legislation, known as the Volstead Act, set down the rules for enforcing the federal ban and defined the types of alcoholic beverages that were prohibited. Not all alcohol was banned; for example, religious use of wine was permitted. Private ownership and consumption of alcohol were not made illegal under federal law, but local laws were stricter in many areas, and some states banned possession outright.

By the late 1920s, a new opposition to Prohibition emerged nationwide. At a critical time in the country's economic history, before and at the beginning of the Great Depression, it was claimed that the policy had lowered tax revenues. Religiously, "rural" Protestant values were being imposed on "urban" America. The Twenty-first Amendment ended Prohibition, though it continued in some states. To date, this is the only time in American history in which a constitutional amendment was passed for the purpose of repealing another.

The overall effects of Prohibition on society are disputed and hard to pin down. Some research indicates that alcohol consumption declined substantially due to Prohibition, while other research indicates that Prohibition did not reduce alcohol consumption in the long term. Americans who wanted to continue drinking alcohol found loopholes in Prohibition laws or used illegal methods to obtain alcohol, resulting in the emergence of black markets and crime syndicates dedicated to distributing alcohol. By contrast, rates of liver cirrhosis, alcoholic psychosis, and infant mortality declined during Prohibition. Because of the lack of uniform national statistics gathered about crime prior to 1930, it is difficult to draw conclusions about Prohibition's effect on crime at the national level. Support for Prohibition diminished steadily throughout its duration, including among former supporters of Prohibition.

== History ==
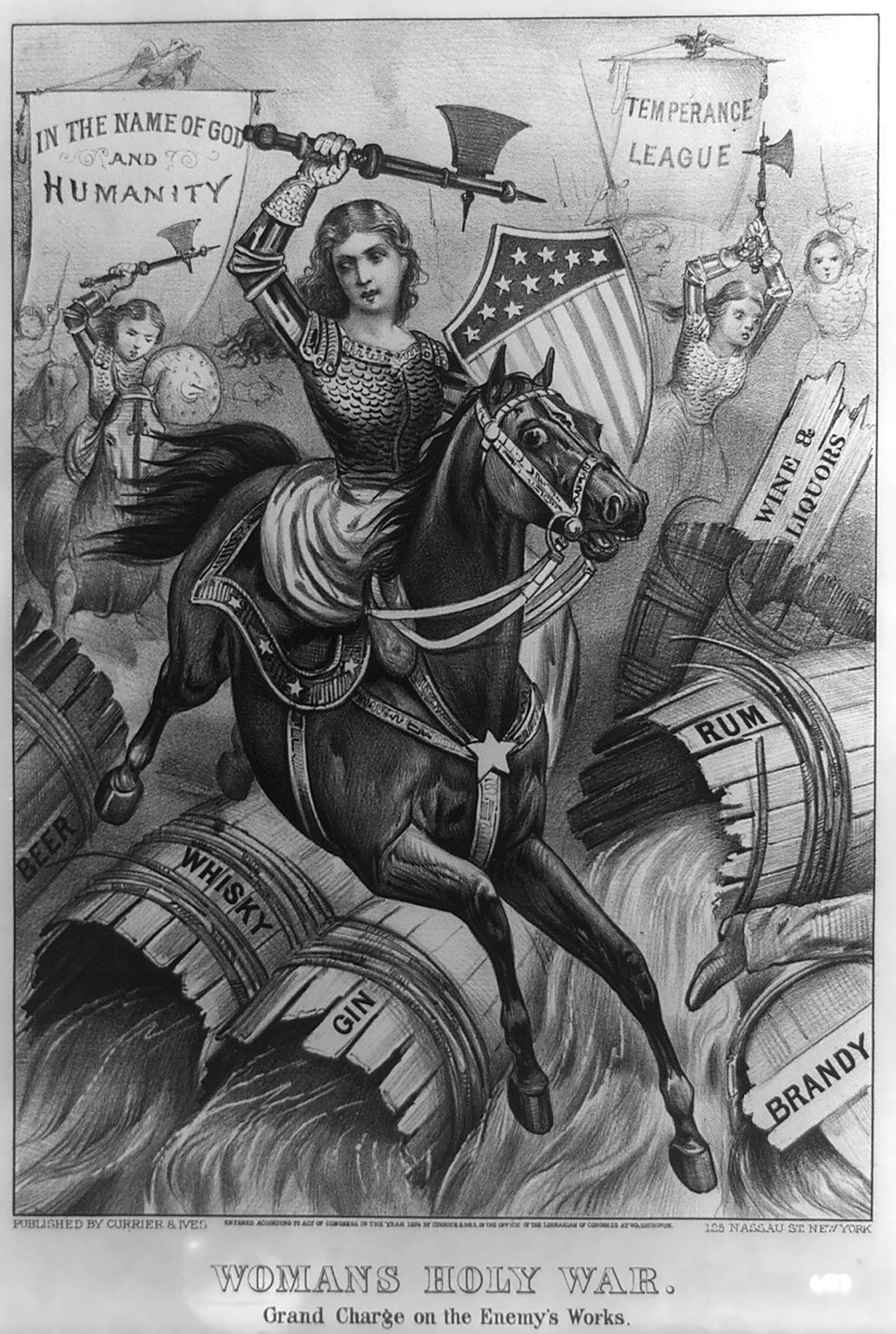
A pro-prohibition political cartoon by Currier and Ives, from 1874

On November 18, 1918, prior to ratification of the Eighteenth Amendment, the U.S. Congress passed the temporary Wartime Prohibition Act, which banned the sale of alcoholic beverages having an alcohol content of greater than 1.28%. This act, which had been intended to save grain for the war effort, was passed ten days after the armistice ending World War I was signed, on November 21, 1918. The Wartime Prohibition Act took effect July 1, 1919, becoming known as the "Thirsty First". In Boston, The Boston Globe reported that leading hotels including Young's and the Parker House ran completely out of gin on the last day, Young's by 2 p.m. and the Parker House by 6 p.m., while homebound crowds on the final night were dominated by men, women, and children carrying packages that "obviously contained liquor," with late cars and trains filled with what the Globe called "these human beasts of burden," notable for the respectability of those "literally toting home their wet goods" before the dawn of the Thirsty First.

The U.S. Senate proposed the Eighteenth Amendment on December 18, 1917. Upon being approved by a 36th state on January 16, 1919, the amendment was ratified as a part of the Constitution. By the terms of the amendment, the country went dry one year later, on January 17, 1920.

On October 28, 1919, Congress passed the Volstead Act, the popular name for the National Prohibition Act, over President Woodrow Wilson's veto. The act established the legal definition of intoxicating liquors as well as penalties for producing them. Although the Volstead Act prohibited the sale of alcohol, the federal government lacked resources to enforce it.

Prohibition was successful in reducing the amount of liquor consumed, cirrhosis death rates, admissions to state mental hospitals for alcoholic psychosis, arrests for public drunkenness, and rates of absenteeism. While many state that Prohibition stimulated the proliferation of rampant underground, organized, and widespread criminal activity, Kenneth D. Rose and Georges-Franck Pinard make the opposite claim that there was no increase in crime during the Prohibition era and that such claims are "rooted in the impressionistic rather than the factual". The highest homicide rate in the United States in the first half of the 20th century occurred during the years of prohibition, decreasing immediately after prohibition ended. By 1925, there were anywhere from 30,000 to 100,000 speakeasy clubs in New York City alone. Wet opposition talked of personal liberty, new tax revenues from legal beer and liquor, and the scourge of organized crime.

On March 22, 1933, President Franklin Roosevelt signed into law the Cullen–Harrison Act, legalizing beer with an alcohol content of 3.2% (by weight) and wine of a similarly low alcohol content. On December 5, ratification of the Twenty-first Amendment repealed the Eighteenth Amendment. However, United States federal law still prohibits the manufacture of distilled spirits without meeting numerous licensing requirements that make it impractical to produce spirits for personal use.

=== Origins ===
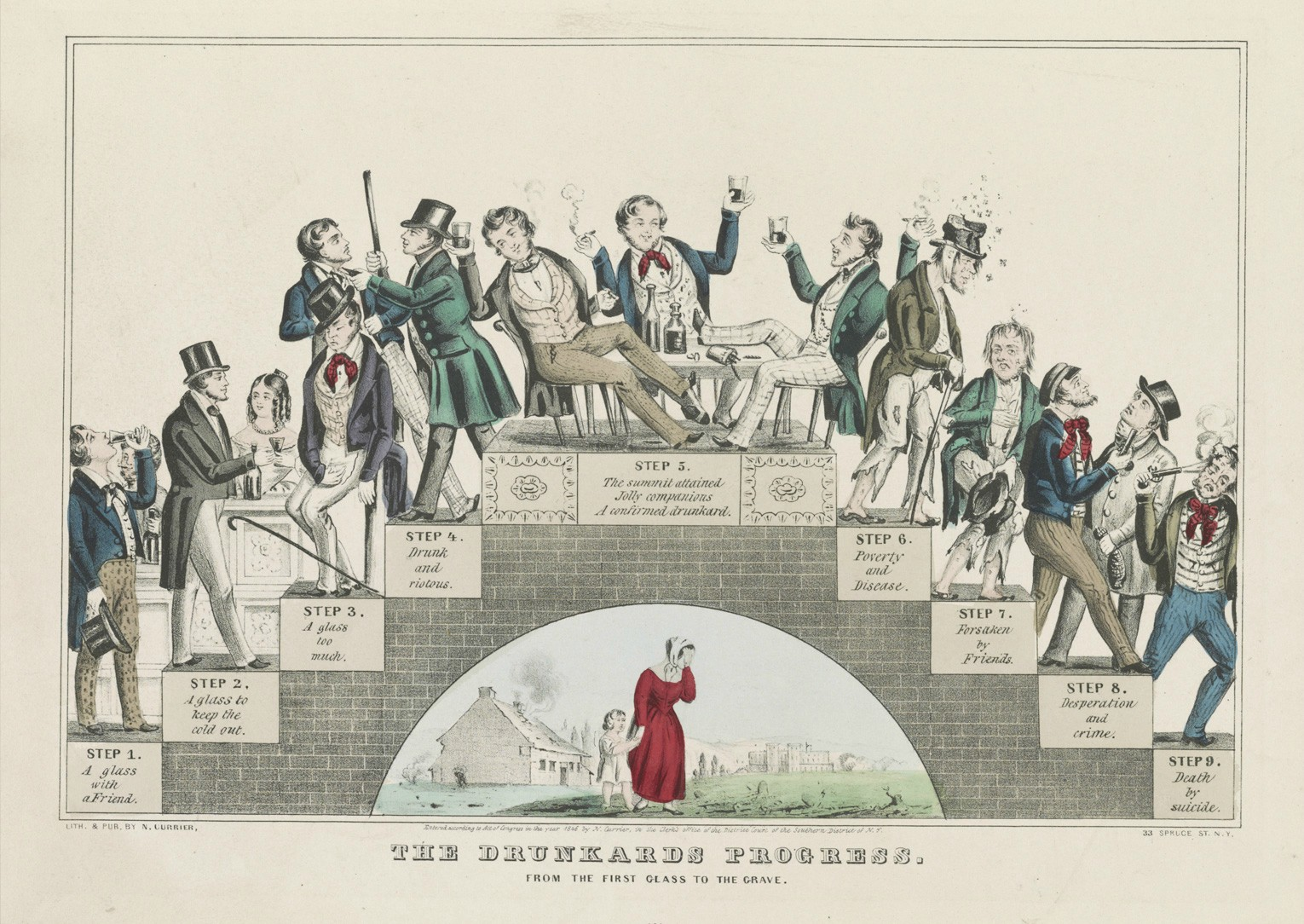
The Drunkard's Progress – moderate drinking leads to drunkenness and disaster: A lithograph by Nathaniel Currier supporting the temperance movement, 1846

Consumption of alcoholic beverages has been a contentious topic in America since the colonial period. On March 26, 1636, the legislature of New Somersetshire met at what is now Saco, Maine, and adopted a law limiting the sale of "strong liquor or wyne", although carving out exceptions for "lodger[s]" and allowing serving to "laborers on working days for one hower at dinner". In May 1657, the General Court of Massachusetts made the sale of strong liquor "whether knowne by the name of rum, strong waters, wine, strong beere, brandie, syder, or peurry, or any other strong liquors" to the Native Americans illegal.

In general, informal social controls in the home and community helped maintain the expectation that the abuse of alcohol was unacceptable: "Drunkenness was condemned and punished, but only as an abuse of a God-given gift. Drink itself was not looked upon as culpable, any more than food deserved blame for the sin of gluttony. Excess was a personal indiscretion." When informal controls failed, there were legal options.

Shortly after the United States obtained independence, the Whiskey Rebellion took place in western Pennsylvania in protest of government-imposed taxes on whiskey. Although the taxes were primarily levied to help pay down the newly formed national debt, it also received support from some social reformers, who hoped a "sin tax" would raise public awareness about the harmful effects of alcohol. The whiskey tax was repealed after Thomas Jefferson's Democratic-Republican Party, which opposed the Federalist Party of Alexander Hamilton, came to power in 1800.

Benjamin Rush, one of the foremost physicians of the late 18th century, believed in moderation rather than prohibition. In his treatise, "The Inquiry into the Effects of Ardent Spirits upon the Human Body and Mind" (1784), Rush argued that the excessive use of alcohol was injurious to physical and psychological health, labeling drunkenness as a disease. Apparently influenced by Rush's widely discussed belief, about 200 farmers in a Connecticut community formed a temperance association in 1789. Similar associations were formed in Virginia in 1800 and New York in 1808.

Within a decade, other temperance groups had formed in eight states, some of them being statewide organizations. The words of Rush and other early temperance reformers served to dichotomize the use of alcohol for men and women. While men enjoyed drinking and often considered it vital to their health, women who began to embrace the ideology of "true motherhood" refrained from the consumption of alcohol. Middle-class women, who were considered the moral authorities of their households, consequently rejected the drinking of alcohol, which they believed to be a threat to the home. In 1830, on average, Americans consumed 1.7 bottles of hard liquor per week, three times the amount consumed in 2010.

=== Development of the prohibition movement ===
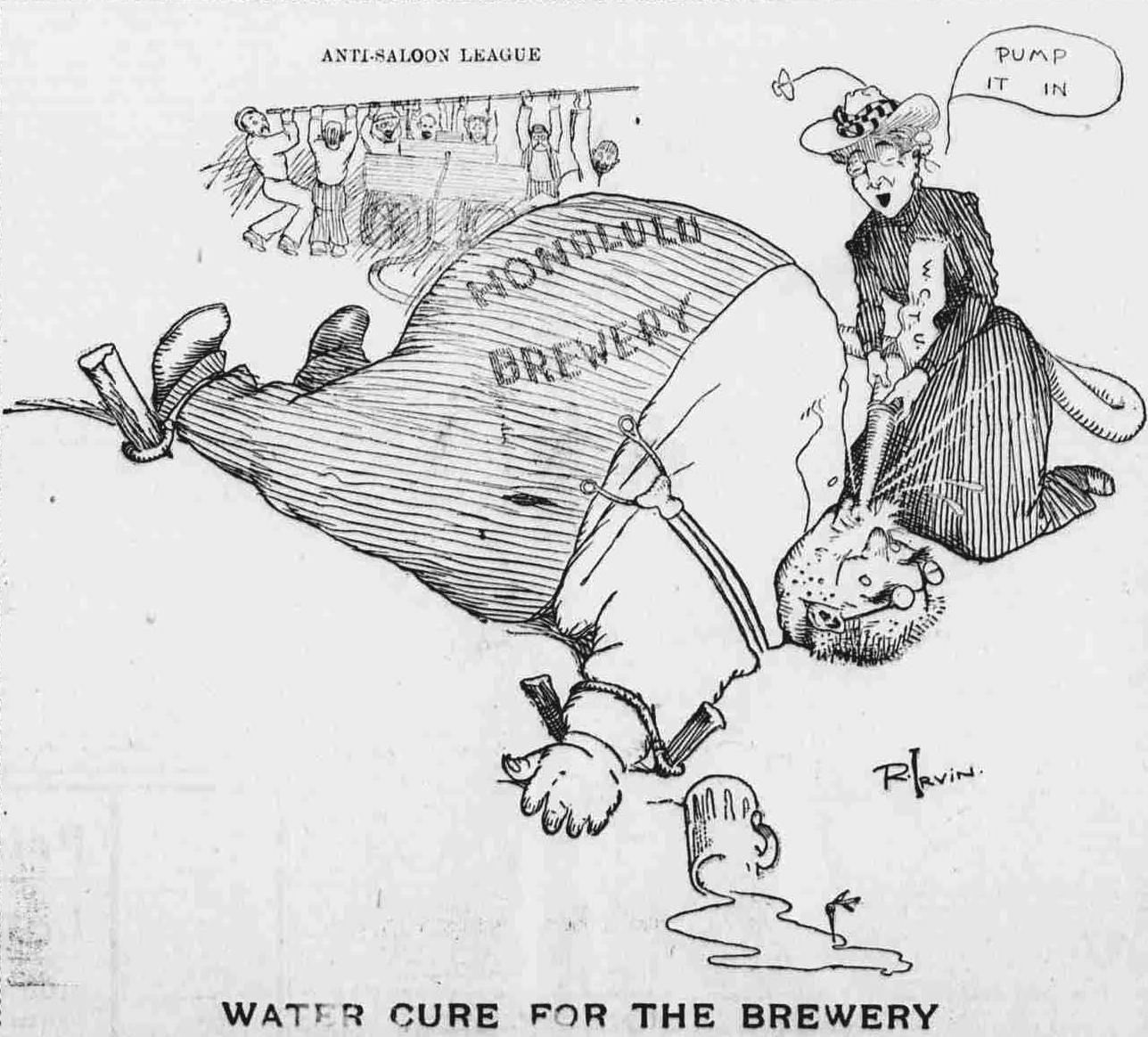
This 1902 illustration by Rea Irvin from the Hawaiian Gazette newspaper humorously illustrates the Anti-Saloon League and the Woman's Christian Temperance Union's campaign against the producers and sellers of beers in Hawaii. The "water cure" was a torture device.

The American Temperance Society (ATS), formed in 1826, helped initiate the first temperance movement and served as a foundation for many later groups. By 1835, the ATS had reached 1.5 million members, with women constituting 35% to 60% of its chapters.

The Prohibition movement, also known as the dry crusade, continued in the 1840s, spearheaded by a range of Protestant denominations, especially the Methodists, Baptists and the Salvation Army. The late 19th century saw the temperance movement broaden its focus from abstinence to include all behavior and institutions related to alcohol consumption. Preachers such as Reverend Mark A. Matthews linked liquor-dispensing saloons with political corruption.

Some successes for the movement were achieved in the 1850s, including the Maine law, adopted in 1851, which banned the manufacture and sale of liquor. Before its repeal in 1856, twelve states followed the example set by Maine in total prohibition. The temperance movement lost strength and was marginalized during the American Civil War (1861–1865). Following the war, social moralists turned to other issues, such as Mormon polygamy and the temperance movement.

The dry crusade was revived by the national Prohibition Party, founded in 1869, and the Woman's Christian Temperance Union (WCTU), founded in 1874. The WCTU advocated the prohibition of alcohol as a method for preventing, through education, abuse from alcoholic husbands. WCTU members believed that if their organization could reach children with its message, it could create a dry sentiment leading to prohibition. Frances Willard, the second president of the WCTU, held that the aims of the organization were to create a "union of women from all denominations, for the purpose of educating the young, forming a better public sentiment, reforming the drinking classes, transforming by the power of Divine grace those who are enslaved by alcohol, and removing the dram-shop from our streets by law". While still denied universal voting privileges, women in the WCTU followed Frances Willard's "Do Everything" doctrine and used temperance as a method of entering into politics and furthering other progressive issues such as prison reform and labor laws.

In 1881, Kansas became the first state to outlaw alcoholic beverages in its Constitution. Arrested over 30 times, and fined and jailed on multiple occasions, prohibition activist Carrie Nation attempted to enforce the state's ban on alcohol consumption. In January 1901, after wrecking what was described as the finest saloon in Wichita and serving two weeks in jail, Nation was released after the Kansas Supreme Court granted a writ of habeas corpus; upon her release she vowed to raid other saloons. She walked into saloons, scolding customers, and used her hatchet to destroy bottles of liquor. Nation recruited ladies into the Carrie Nation Prohibition Group, which she also led. While Nation's vigilante techniques were rare, other activists enforced the dry cause by entering saloons, singing, praying, and urging saloonkeepers to stop selling alcohol. Other dry states, especially those in the South, enacted prohibition legislation, as did individual counties within a state.

Court cases also debated the subject of prohibition. While some cases ruled in opposition, the general tendency was toward support. In Mugler v. Kansas (1887), Justice Harlan commented: "We cannot shut out of view the fact, within the knowledge of all, that the public health, the public morals, and the public safety, may be endangered by the general use of intoxicating drinks; nor the fact established by statistics accessible to every one, that the idleness, disorder, pauperism and crime existing in the country, are, in some degree...traceable to this evil." In support of prohibition, Crowley v. Christensen (1890), remarked: "The statistics of every state show a greater amount of crime and misery attributable to the use of ardent spirits obtained at these retail liquor saloons than to any other source."

The proliferation of neighborhood saloons in the post-Civil War era became a phenomenon of an increasingly industrialized, urban workforce. Workingmen's bars were popular social gathering places from the workplace and home life. The brewing industry was actively involved in establishing saloons as a lucrative consumer base in their business chain. Saloons were more often than not linked to a specific brewery, where the saloonkeeper's operation was financed by a brewer and contractually obligated to sell the brewer's product to the exclusion of competing brands.

A saloon's business model often included the offer of a free lunch, where the bill of fare commonly consisted of heavily salted food meant to induce thirst and the purchase of drink. During the Progressive Era (1890–1920), hostility toward saloons and their political influence became widespread, with the Anti-Saloon League superseding the Prohibition Party and the Woman's Christian Temperance Union as the most influential advocate of prohibition, after these latter two groups expanded their efforts to support other social reform issues, such as women's suffrage, onto their prohibition platform.

"Save A Little Dram For Me" (1922)
*A dram is a small unit of measurement.

Prohibition was an important force in state and local politics from the 1840s to the 1930s. Numerous historical studies demonstrated that the political forces involved were ethnoreligious. Prohibition was supported by the dries, primarily pietistic evangelical Protestant denominations that included Methodists, Northern Baptists, Southern Baptists, New School Presbyterians, Disciples of Christ, Congregationalists, Quakers, and Scandinavian Lutherans, but also included the Catholic Total Abstinence Union of America and, to a certain extent, the Mormons. These religious groups identified saloons as politically corrupt and drinking as a personal sin. Secular dry organizations were led by the powerful Anti-Saloon League and the Woman's Christian Temperance Union.

The Dry prohibition crusade was opposed by the wets, led by liturgical or ritualistic Protestants (Episcopalians and German Lutherans) and Catholics, who denounced the idea that the government should define morality. Even in the wet stronghold of New York City there was an active prohibition movement, led by Norwegian church groups and African-American labor activists who believed that prohibition would benefit workers, especially African Americans. Tea merchants and soda fountain manufacturers generally supported prohibition, believing a ban on alcohol would increase sales of their products.

A particularly effective operator on the political front was Wayne Wheeler of the Anti-Saloon League, who made Prohibition a wedge issue and succeeded in getting many pro-prohibition candidates elected. Coming from Ohio, his deep resentment for alcohol started at a young age. He was injured on a farm by a worker who had been drunk. This event transformed Wheeler. Starting low in the ranks, he quickly moved up due to his deep-rooted hatred of alcohol. He later realized to further the movement he would need more public approval, and fast. This was the start of his policy called 'Wheelerism' where he used the media to make it seem like the general public was "in on" on a specific issue. Wheeler became known as the "dry boss" because of his influence and power.

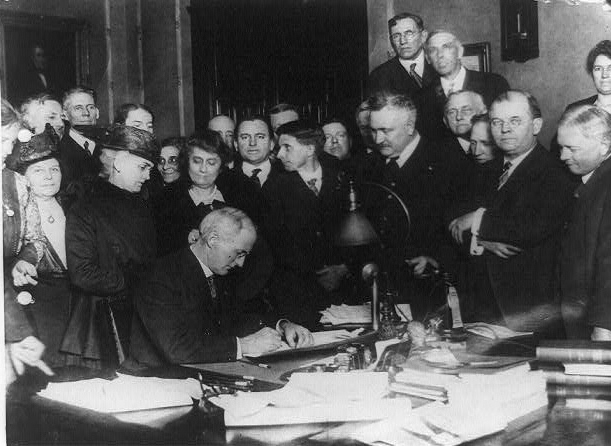
Governor James P. Goodrich signs the Indiana Prohibition Act, 1917.

Prohibition represented a conflict between urban and rural values emerging in the United States. Given the mass influx of migrants to the urban centers of the United States, many individuals within the prohibition movement associated the crime and morally corrupt behavior of American cities with their large, immigrant populations. Saloons frequented by immigrants in these cities were often frequented by politicians who wanted to obtain the immigrants' votes in exchange for favors such as job offers, legal assistance, and food baskets. Thus, saloons were seen as a breeding ground for political corruption.

Most economists during the early 20th century were in favor of the enactment of the Eighteenth Amendment (Prohibition). Simon Patten, one of the leading advocates for prohibition, predicted that prohibition would eventually happen in the United States for competitive and evolutionary reasons. Yale economics professor Irving Fisher, who was a dry, wrote extensively about prohibition, including a paper that made an economic case for prohibition. Fisher is credited with supplying the criteria against which future prohibitions, such as against marijuana, could be measured, in terms of crime, health, and productivity. For example, "Blue Monday" referred to the hangover workers experienced after a weekend of binge drinking, resulting in Mondays being a wasted productive day. New research has discredited Fisher's research, which was based on uncontrolled experiments; regardless, his $6 billion figure for the annual gains of Prohibition to the United States continues to be cited.

In a backlash to the emerging reality of a changing American demographic, many prohibitionists subscribed to the doctrine of nativism, in which they endorsed the notion that the success of America was a result of its white Anglo-Saxon ancestry. This belief fostered distrust of immigrant communities that fostered saloons and incorporated drinking in their popular culture.

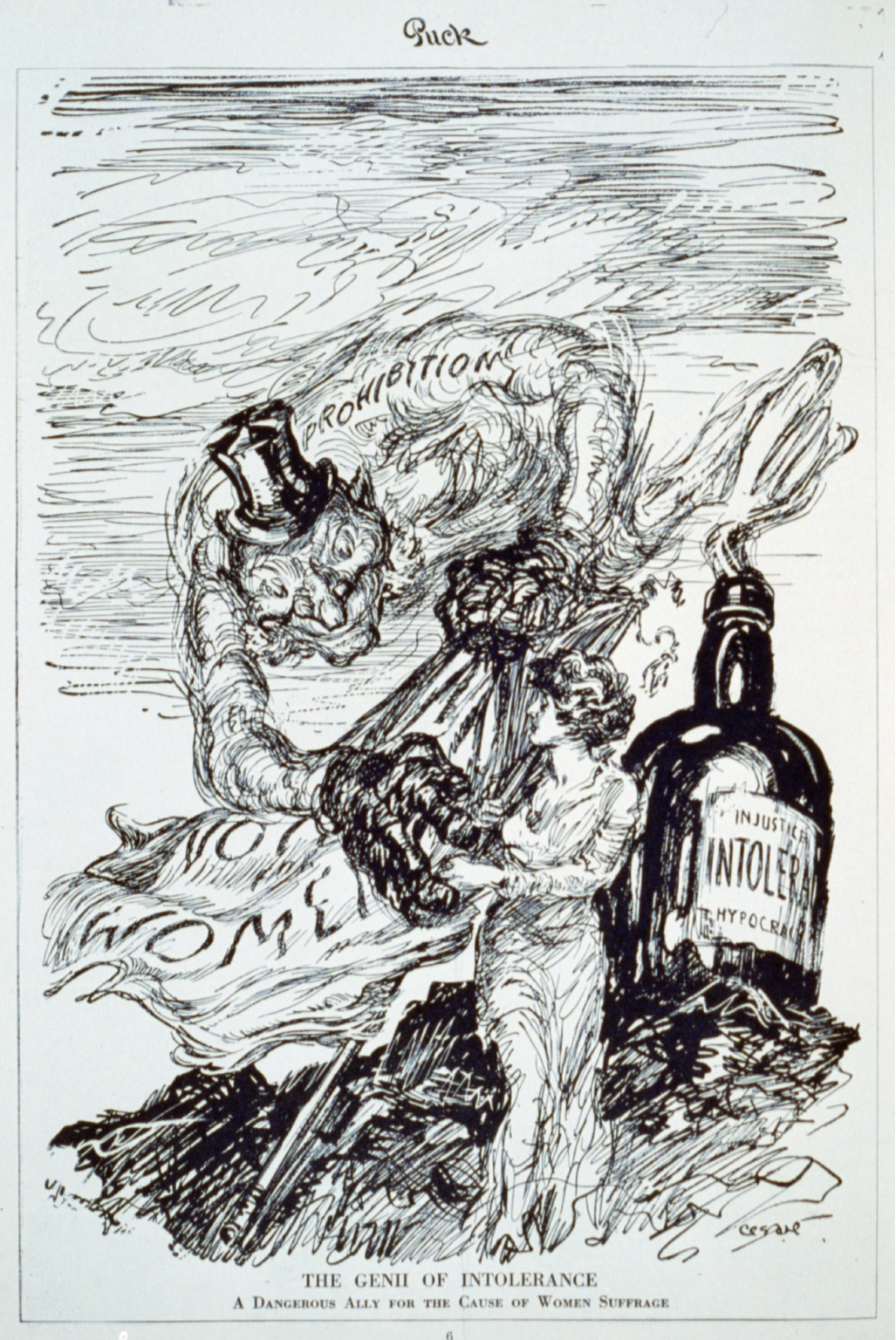
A 1915 political cartoon by Oscar Cesare criticizing the alliance between the prohibitionists and women's suffrage movements, showing the Genii of Intolerance, labelled "Prohibition", emerging from its bottle

Two other amendments to the Constitution were championed by dry crusaders to help their cause. One was granted in the Sixteenth Amendment (1913), which replaced alcohol taxes that funded the federal government with a federal income tax. The other was women's suffrage, which was granted after the passage of the Nineteenth Amendment in 1920. Since women tended to support prohibition, temperance organizations tended to support women's suffrage.

In the presidential election of 1916, the Democratic incumbent, Woodrow Wilson, and the Republican candidate, Charles Evans Hughes, ignored the prohibition issue, as did both parties' political platforms. Democrats and Republicans had strong wet and dry factions, and the election was expected to be close, with neither candidate wanting to alienate any part of his political base.

When the 65th Congress convened in March 1917, the dries outnumbered the wets by 140 to 64 in the Democratic Party and 138 to 62 among Republicans. With America's declaration of war against Germany in April, German Americans, a major force against prohibition, were sidelined and their protests subsequently ignored. In addition, a new justification for prohibition arose: prohibiting the production of alcoholic beverages would allow more resources—especially grain that would otherwise be used to make alcohol—to be devoted to the war effort. While wartime prohibition was a spark for the movement, World War I ended before nationwide Prohibition was enacted.

A resolution calling for a Constitutional amendment to accomplish nationwide Prohibition was introduced in Congress and passed by both houses in December 1917. By January 16, 1919, the Amendment had been ratified by 36 of the 48 states, making it law. Eventually, only two states—Connecticut and Rhode Island—opted out of ratifying it. On October 28, 1919, Congress passed enabling legislation, known as the Volstead Act, to enforce the Eighteenth Amendment when it went into effect in 1920.

==== Start of national prohibition (January 1920) ====
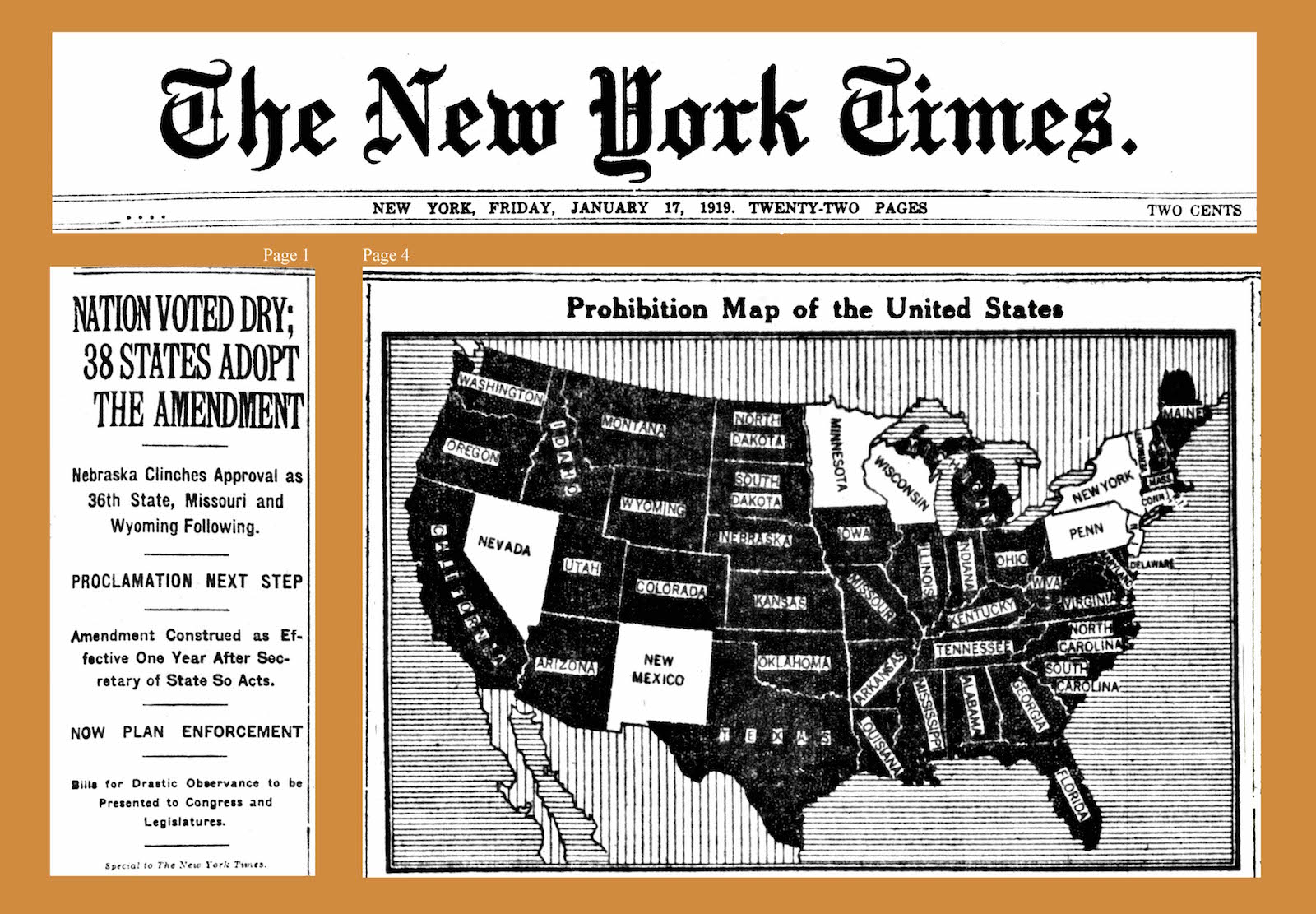
After the 36th state adopted the amendment on January 16, 1919, the U.S. Secretary of State had to issue a formal proclamation declaring its ratification. Implementing and enforcement bills had to be presented to Congress and state legislatures, to be enacted before the amendment's effective date one year later.

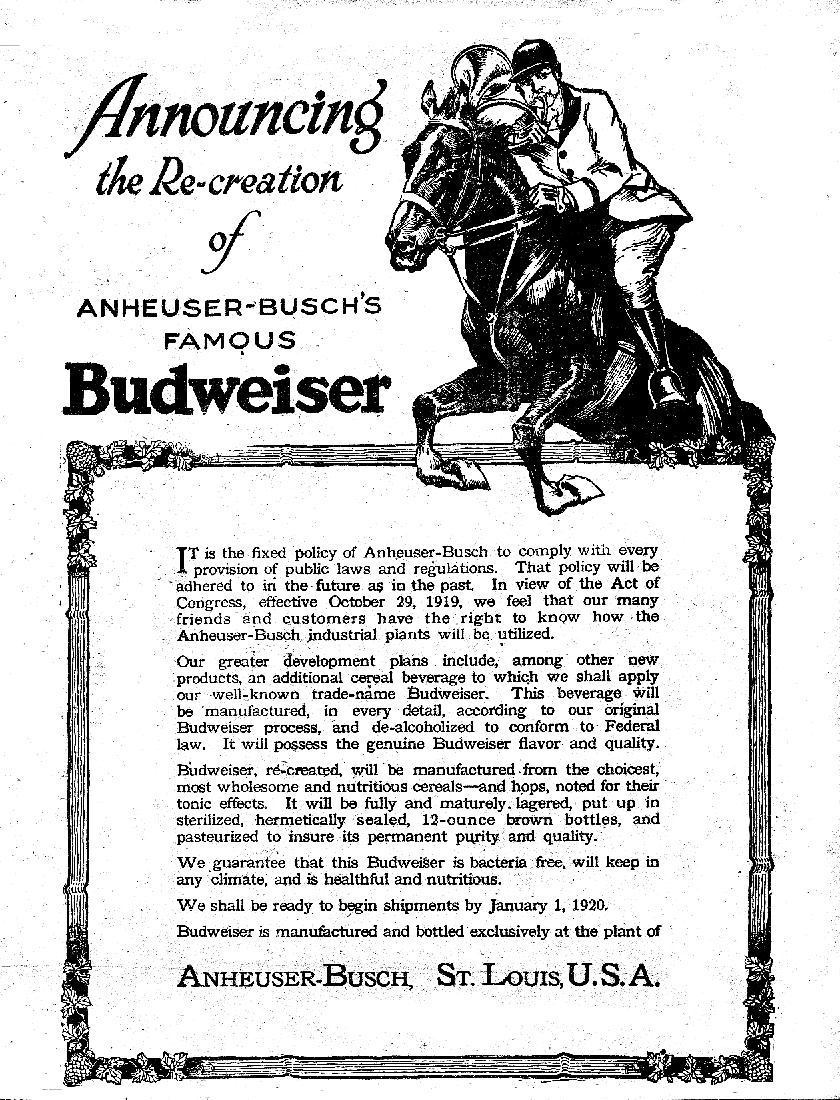
A 1919 Budweiser ad from Anheuser-Busch, announcing the reformulation of its flagship beer as required under the Act, ready for sale by 1920

Prohibition began on January 17, 1920, when the Volstead Act went into effect. In Indianapolis, Prohibition's arrival was marked by a jubilee service held by dry workers at the Central Christian Church under the auspices of the Prohibition Party, the Marion County W.C.T.U., the Indianapolis church federation, and the Anti-Saloon League; the first person arrested in the city for a Volstead Act violation was seized just five minutes after midnight for selling a glass of brandy. In New York City, an Associated Press report noted that at 12:05 a.m., four minutes after the amendment took effect, a Brooklyn café owner was arrested by an internal revenue inspector for selling brandy, with his bartender arrested a minute later; 100 revenue inspectors patrolled the white light district alongside the city's 15,000 policemen, causing saloonkeepers to close their doors "somewhat unceremoniously". A total of 1,520 Federal Prohibition agents (police) were tasked with enforcement.

Supporters of the Amendment soon became confident that it would not be repealed. One of its creators, Senator Morris Sheppard, joked that "there is as much chance of repealing the Eighteenth Amendment as there is for a humming-bird to fly to the planet Mars with the Washington Monument tied to its tail."

At the same time, songs emerged decrying the act. After Edward, Prince of Wales, returned to the United Kingdom following his tour of Canada in 1919, he recounted to his father, King George V, a ditty he had heard at a border town:

Four and twenty Yankees, feeling very dry,
Went across the border to get a drink of rye.
When the rye was opened, the Yanks began to sing,
"God bless America, but God save the King!"

Prohibition became highly controversial among medical professionals because alcohol was widely prescribed by the era's physicians for therapeutic purposes. Congress held hearings on the medicinal value of beer in 1921. Subsequently, physicians across the country lobbied for the repeal of Prohibition as it applied to medicinal liquors. From 1921 to 1930, doctors earned about $40 million for whiskey prescriptions.

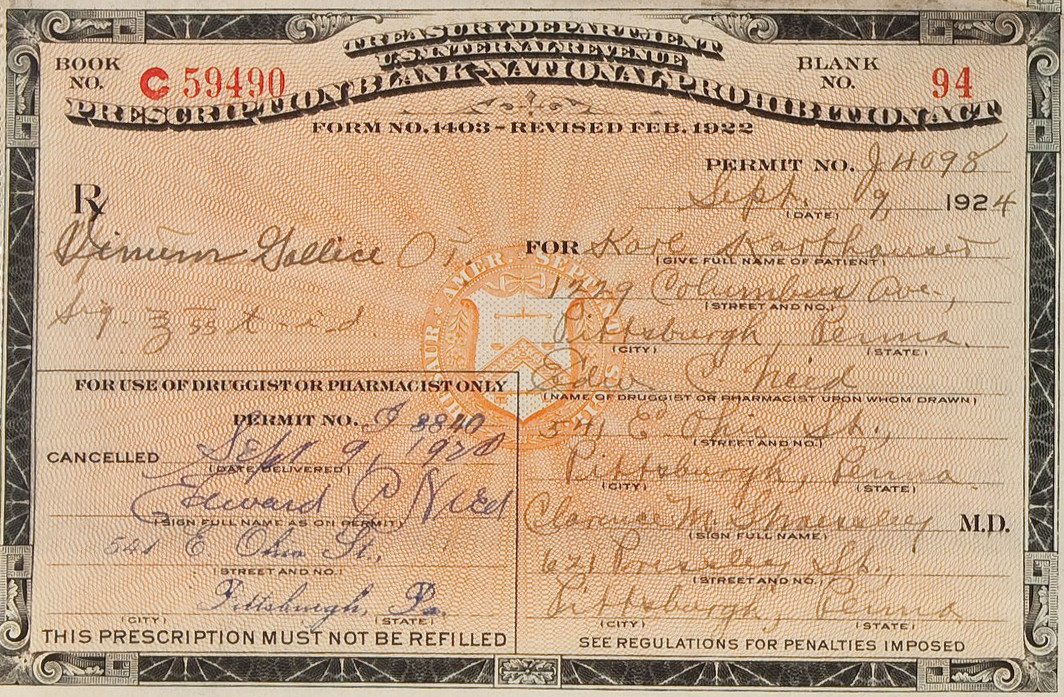
A prescription for medicinal alcohol during prohibition

While the manufacture, importation, sale, and transport of alcohol was illegal in the United States, Section 29 of the Volstead Act allowed wine and cider to be made from fruit at home, but not beer. Up to 200 gallons of wine and cider per year could be made, and some vineyards grew grapes for home use. The Act did not prohibit the consumption of alcohol. Many people stockpiled wines and liquors for their personal use in the latter part of 1919 before sales of alcoholic beverages became illegal in January 1920.

Since alcohol was legal in neighboring countries, distilleries and breweries in Canada, Mexico, and the Caribbean flourished as their products were either consumed by visiting Americans or smuggled into the United States illegally. The Detroit River, which forms part of the U.S. border with Canada, was notoriously difficult to control, especially rum-running in Windsor, Ontario. When the U.S. government complained to Britain that Prohibition was being undermined by officials in Nassau, The Bahamas, the head of the Colonial Office refused to intervene. Winston Churchill believed that Prohibition was "an affront to the whole history of mankind".

Three federal agencies were assigned the task of enforcing the Volstead Act: the U.S. Coast Guard Office of Law Enforcement, the U.S. Treasury's IRS Bureau of Prohibition, and the U.S. Department of Justice Bureau of Prohibition.

=== Bootlegging and hoarding old supplies ===
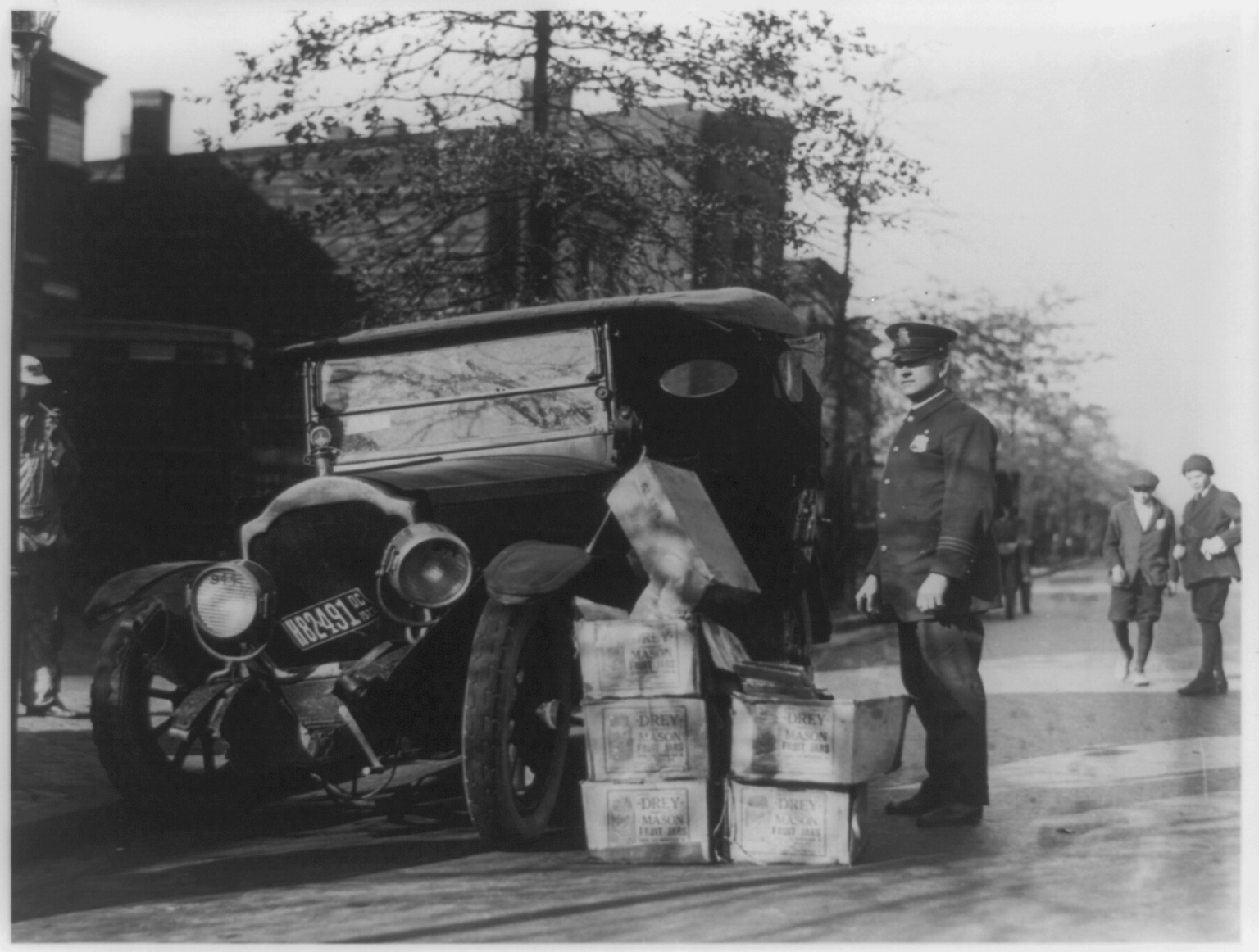
A policeman with a wrecked automobile and confiscated moonshine, 1922

As early as 1925, journalist H. L. Mencken believed that Prohibition was not working. Historian David Oshinsky, summarizing the work of Daniel Okrent, wrote that "Prohibition worked best when directed at its primary target: the working-class poor." Historian Lizabeth Cohen writes: "A rich family could have a cellar-full of liquor and get by, it seemed, but if a poor family had one bottle of home-brew, there would be trouble." Working-class people were inflamed by the fact that their employers could dip into a private cache while they, the employees, could not. Within a week after Prohibition went into effect, small portable stills were on sale throughout the country.

Before the Eighteenth Amendment went into effect in January 1920, many of the upper classes stockpiled alcohol for legal home consumption after Prohibition began. They bought the inventories of liquor retailers and wholesalers, emptying out their warehouses, saloons, and club storerooms. President Woodrow Wilson moved his own supply of alcoholic beverages to his Washington residence after his term of office ended. His successor, Warren G. Harding, relocated his own large supply into the White House.

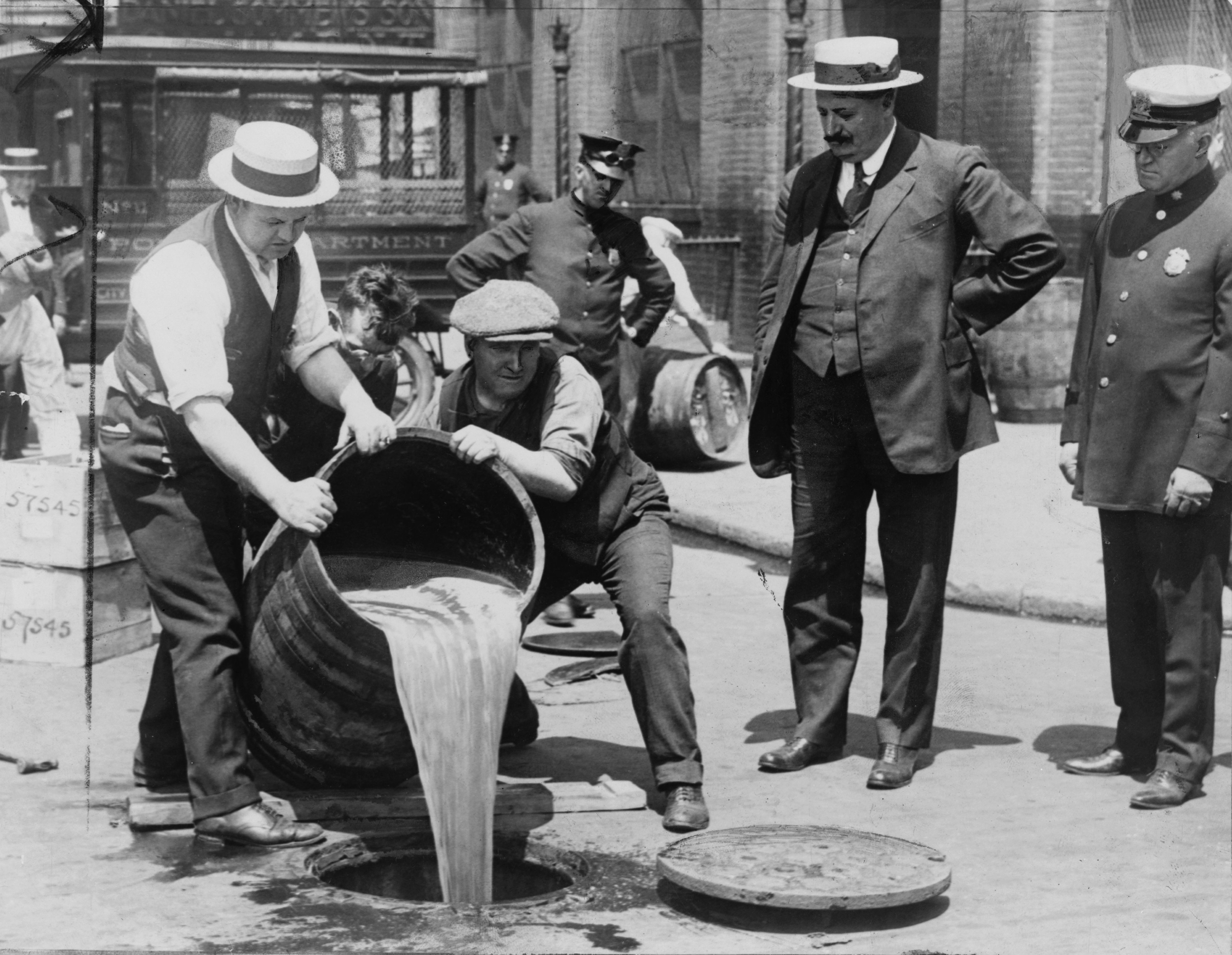
Disposal of liquor during Prohibition

After the Eighteenth Amendment became law, bootlegging became widespread. In the first six months of 1920, the federal government opened 7,291 cases for Volstead Act violations. In the first complete fiscal year (1921), the number of cases violating the Volstead Act jumped to 29,114 violations and would rise dramatically over the next thirteen years. By 1923 purveyors of moonshine in Chicago often smuggled alcohol inside hollowed-out loaves of rye bread, leading the newspaper exposé to jocularly dub them "dough-runners".

Grape juice was not restricted by Prohibition, even though if it was allowed to sit for sixty days it would ferment and turn to wine with a twelve percent alcohol content. Many people took advantage of this as grape juice output quadrupled during the Prohibition era.

To prevent bootleggers from using industrial ethyl alcohol to produce illegal beverages, the federal government ordered the denaturation of industrial alcohols, meaning they must include additives to make them unpalatable or poisonous. In response, bootleggers hired chemists who successfully removed the additives from the alcohol to make it drinkable. As a response, the Treasury Department required manufacturers to add more deadly poisons, including the particularly deadly combination referred to (incorrectly) as "methyl alcohol": 4 parts methanol, 2.25 parts pyridine base, and 0.5 parts benzene per 100 parts ethyl alcohol.

New York City medical examiners prominently opposed these policies because of the danger to human life. As many as 10,000 people died from drinking denatured alcohol before Prohibition ended. New York City medical examiner Charles Norris believed the government took responsibility for murder when they knew the poison was not deterring consumption and they continued to poison industrial alcohol (which would be used in drinking alcohol) anyway. Norris remarked: "The government knows it is not stopping drinking by putting poison in alcohol ... [Y]et it continues its poisoning processes, heedless of the fact that people determined to drink are daily absorbing that poison. Knowing this to be true, the United States government must be charged with the moral responsibility for the deaths that poisoned liquor causes, although it cannot be held legally responsible."

A 1933 newsreel about the end of Prohibition

Another lethal substance that was often substituted for alcohol was Sterno, a denatured form of ethyl alcohol adulterated with methanol and a jelling agent, commonly known as "canned heat". Forcing the substance through a makeshift filter, such as a handkerchief, created a rough liquor substitute; however, the result was poisonous, though not often lethal.

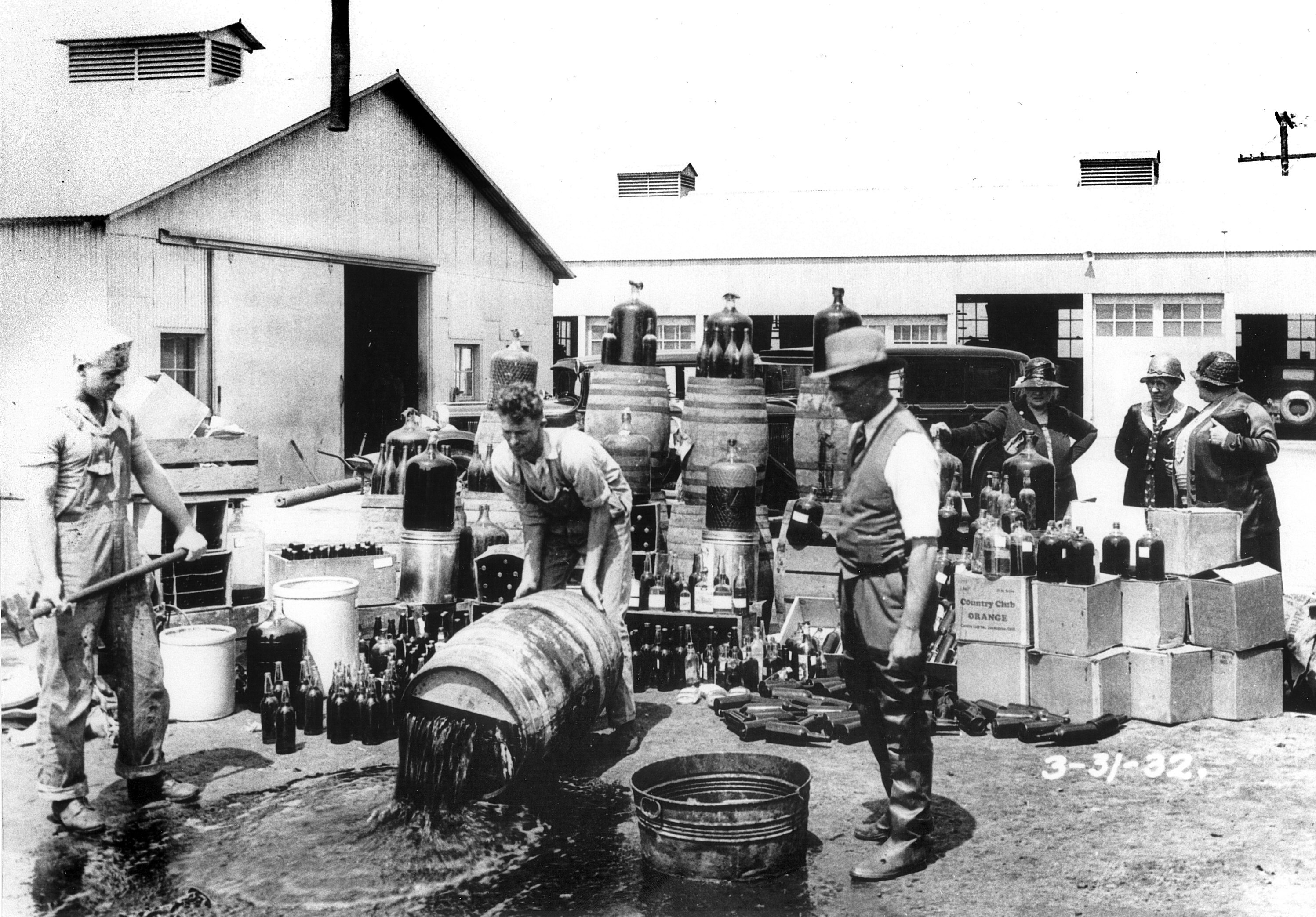
Orange County, California, sheriff's deputies dumping illegal alcohol, 1932

Making alcohol at home was common among some families with wet sympathies during Prohibition. Stores sold grape concentrate with warning labels that listed the steps that should be avoided to prevent the juice from fermenting into wine. Some drugstores sold "medical wine" with around a 22% alcohol content. In order to justify the sale, the wine was given a medicinal taste. Home-distilled hard liquor was called bathtub gin in northern cities, and moonshine in rural areas of Virginia, Kentucky, North Carolina, South Carolina, Georgia, West Virginia and Tennessee. Making drinkable hard liquor was easier than homebrewing good beer. Since selling privately distilled alcohol was illegal and bypassed government taxation, law enforcement officers relentlessly pursued manufacturers. In response, bootleggers modified their cars and trucks by enhancing the engines and suspensions to make faster vehicles that would improve their chances of outrunning and escaping agents of the Bureau of Prohibition, commonly called "revenue agents" or "revenuers". These cars became known as "moonshine runners" or "'shine runners". Shops with wet sympathies were also known to participate in the underground liquor market, by loading their stocks with ingredients for liquors, including Bénédictine, vermouth, scotch mash, and even ethyl alcohol; anyone could purchase these ingredients legally.

In October 1930, just two weeks before the congressional midterm elections, bootlegger George Cassiday—"the man in the green hat"—came forward and told members of Congress how he had bootlegged for ten years. One of the few bootleggers ever to tell his story, Cassiday wrote five front-page articles for The Washington Post, in which he estimated that 80% of congressmen and senators drank. The Democrats in the North were mostly wets, and in the 1932 election, they made major gains. The wets argued that Prohibition was not stopping crime, and was actually causing the creation of large-scale, well-funded, and well-armed criminal syndicates. As Prohibition became increasingly unpopular, especially in urban areas, its repeal was eagerly anticipated. Wets had the organization and the initiative. They pushed the argument that states and localities needed the tax money. President Herbert Hoover proposed a new constitutional amendment that was vague on particulars and satisfied neither side. Franklin Roosevelt's Democratic platform promised repeal of the 18th Amendment.

When Prohibition was repealed in 1933, many bootleggers and suppliers with wet sympathies simply moved into the legitimate liquor business. Some crime syndicates moved their efforts into expanding their protection rackets to cover legal liquor sales and other business areas.

=== Medical liquor ===
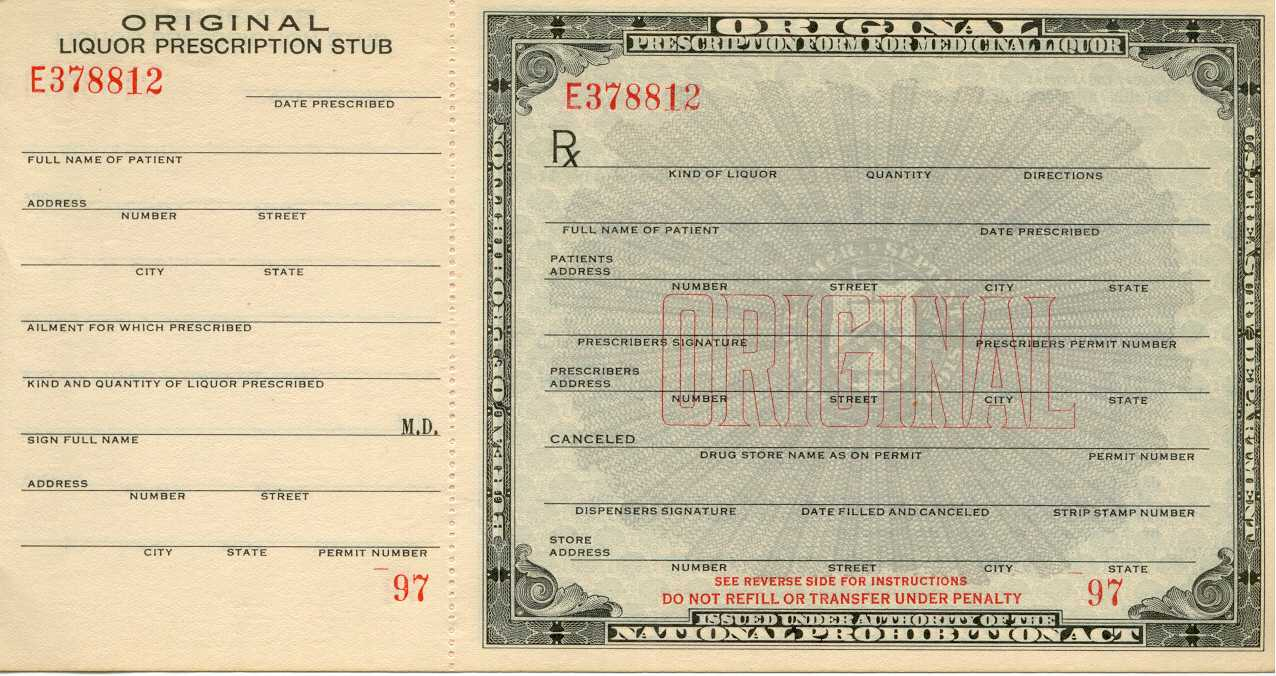
A Prohibition-era prescription used by U.S. physicians to prescribe liquor as medicine

Doctors were able to prescribe medicinal alcohol for their patients. After just six months of prohibition, over 15,000 doctors and 57,000 pharmacists received licenses to prescribe or sell medicinal alcohol. Doctors could write prescriptions for alcohol for many different conditions, and the rules were not very strict. Some doctors wrote very large amounts prescriptions, one for example wrote 475 in a single day. These professionals kept really poor records which made it harder for the authorities to find them.

According to Gastro Obscura,

Physicians wrote an estimated 11 million prescriptions a year throughout the 1920s, and Prohibition Commissioner John F. Kramer even cited one doctor who wrote 475 prescriptions for whiskey in one day. It wasn't tough for people to write—and fill—counterfeit prescriptions at pharmacies, either. Naturally, bootleggers bought prescription forms from crooked doctors and mounted widespread scams. In 1931, 400 pharmacists and 1,000 doctors were caught in a scam where doctors sold signed prescription forms to bootleggers. Just 12 doctors and 13 pharmacists were indicted, and the ones charged faced a one-time $50 fine. Selling alcohol through drugstores became so much of a lucrative open secret that it is name-checked in works such as The Great Gatsby. Historians speculate that Charles R. Walgreen, of Walgreens fame, expanded from 20 stores to a staggering 525 during the 1920s thanks to medicinal alcohol sales."

— Paula Mejia, "The Lucrative Business of Prescribing Booze During Prohibition"; Gastro Obscura, 2017.

=== Enforcement ===
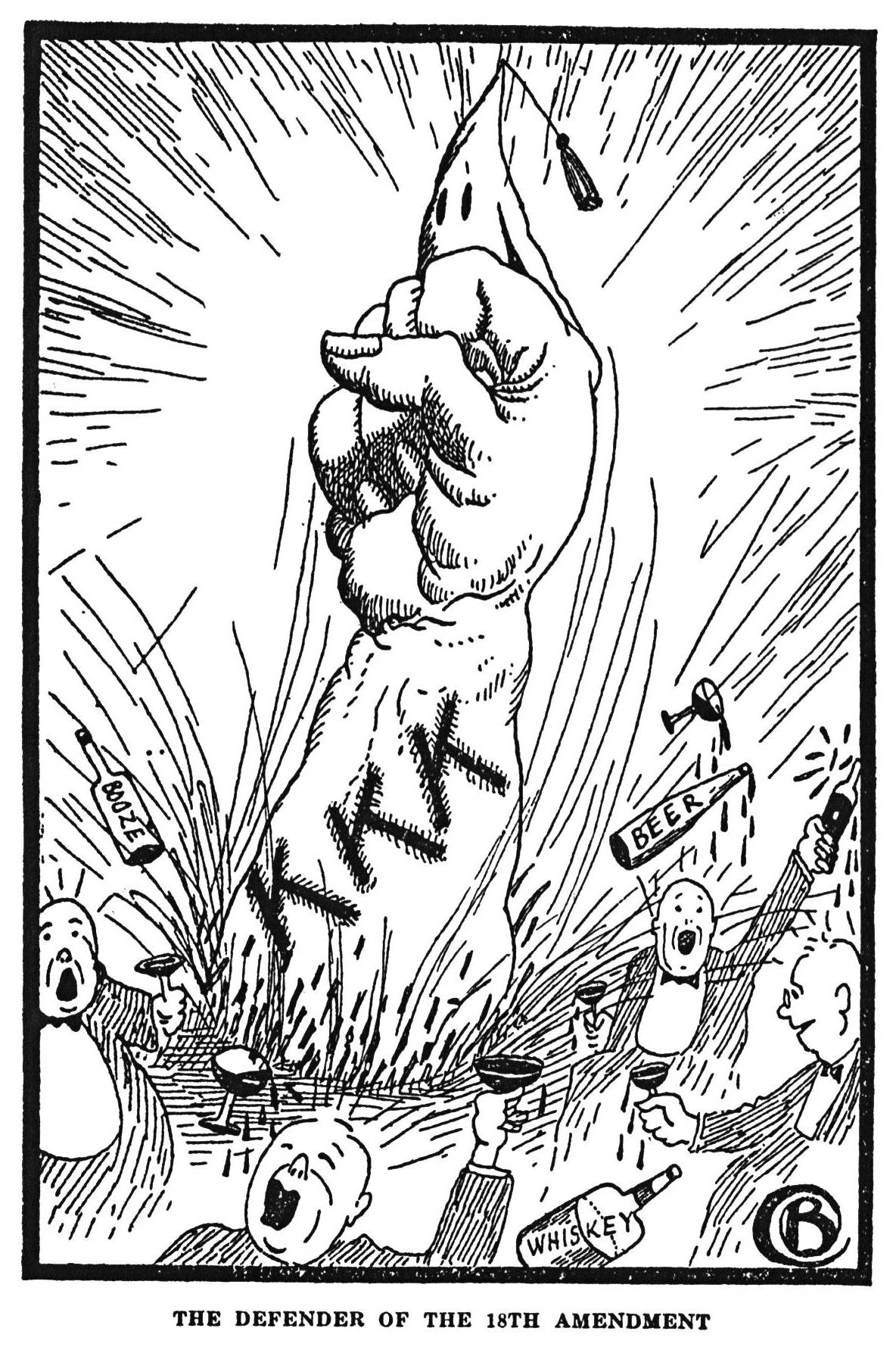
The Defender Of The 18th Amendment by Branford Clarke, from Klansmen: Guardians of Liberty published by the Pillar of Fire Church

Some states like Maryland and New York refused to enforce the federal prohibition amendment. Enforcement of the law under the Eighteenth Amendment lacked a centralized authority. Clergymen were sometimes called upon to form vigilante groups to assist in the enforcement of Prohibition. Furthermore, American geography contributed to the difficulties in enforcing Prohibition. The varied terrain of valleys, mountains, lakes and swamps, as well as the extensive seaways, ports and borders that the United States shared with Canada and Mexico made it exceedingly difficult for Prohibition agents to stop bootleggers given their lack of resources. Ultimately it was recognized with its repeal that the means by which the law was to be enforced were not pragmatic, and in many cases, the legislature did not match the general public opinion.

In Cicero, Illinois, a suburb of Chicago, the prevalence of ethnic communities who had wet sympathies allowed prominent gang leader Al Capone to operate despite the presence of police.

The Ku Klux Klan talked a great deal about denouncing bootleggers and threatened private vigilante action against known offenders. Despite its large membership in the mid-1920s, it was poorly organized and seldom had an effect. After 1925 the KKK helped disparage any enforcement of Prohibition.

Prohibition was a major blow to the alcoholic beverage industry and its repeal was a step toward the amelioration of one sector of the economy. An example of this is the case of St. Louis, one of the most important alcohol producers before Prohibition started, which was ready to resume its position in the industry as soon as possible. Its major brewery had "50,000 barrels" of beer ready for distribution from March 22, 1933, and was the first alcohol producer to resupply the market; others soon followed. After repeal, stores obtained liquor licenses and restocked for business. After beer production resumed, thousands of workers found jobs in the industry again.

Prohibition created a black market that competed with the formal economy, which came under pressure when the Great Depression struck in 1929. State governments urgently needed the tax revenue alcohol sales had generated. Franklin Roosevelt was elected in 1932 based in part on his promise to end prohibition, which influenced his support for ratifying the Twenty-first Amendment to repeal Prohibition.

In 1929 Wickersham Commission that studied the Prohibition enforcement was created. Its final report, commonly known as the Wickersham Report, released on January 7, 1931, documented the widespread evasion of Prohibition. Franklin P. Adams, a columnist for the New York World, summarized his opinion of the commission's report with this poem:

Prohibition is an awful flop.
We like it.
It can't stop what it's meant to stop.
We like it.
It's left a trail of graft and slime
It don't prohibit worth a dime
It's filled our land with vice and crime,
Nevertheless, we're for it.

== Repeal ==
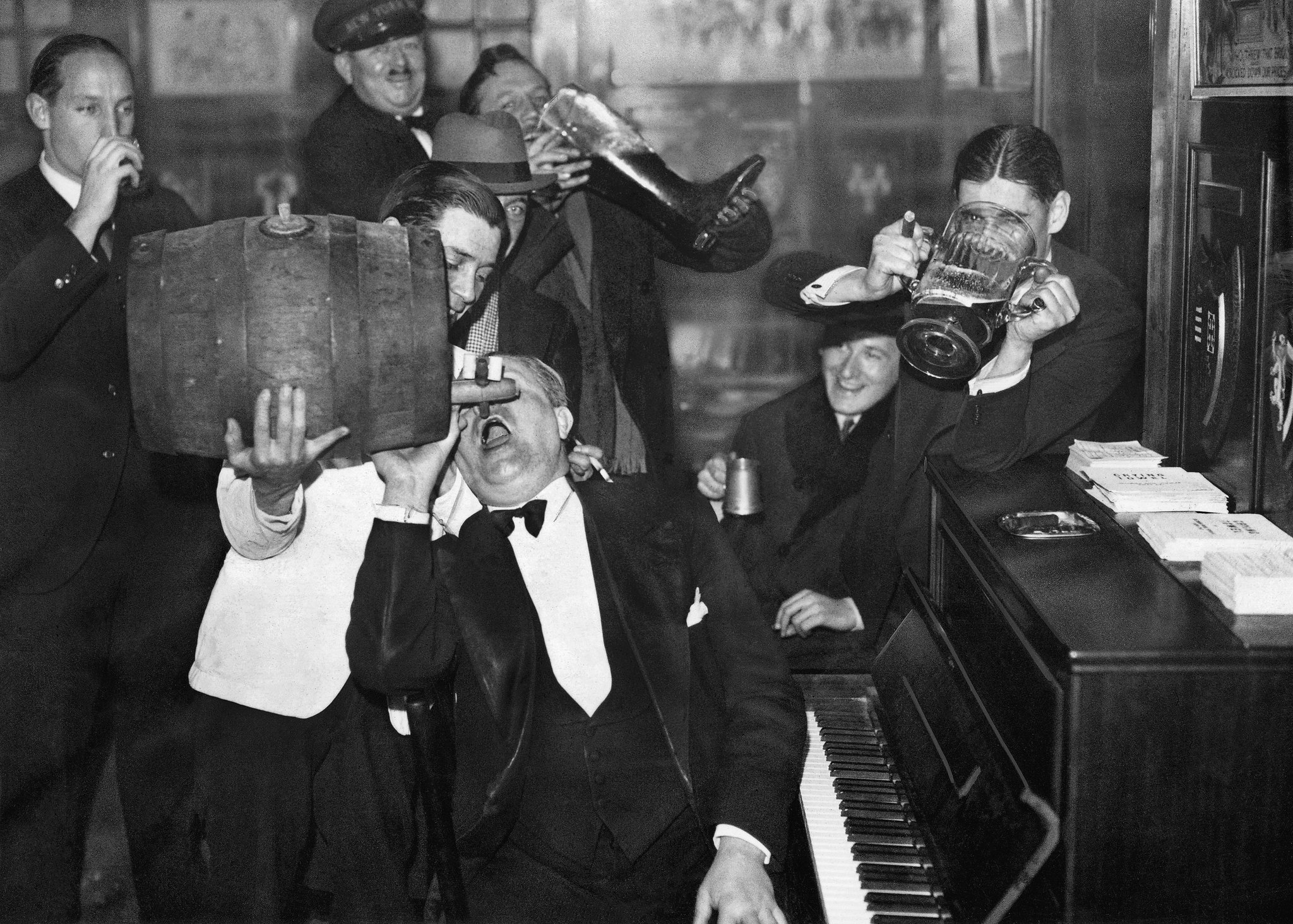
Americans celebrating the end of Prohibition in 1933

Naval Captain William H. Stayton was a prominent figure in the anti-prohibition fight, founding the Association Against the Prohibition Amendment in 1918. The AAPA was the largest of the nearly forty organizations that fought to end Prohibition. Economic urgency played a large part in accelerating the advocacy for repeal. The number of conservatives who pushed for prohibition in the beginning decreased. Many farmers who fought for prohibition now fought for repeal because of the negative effects it had on the agriculture business.

Prior to the 1920 implementation of the Volstead Act, approximately 14% of federal, state, and local tax revenues were derived from alcohol commerce. When the Great Depression hit and tax revenues plunged, the governments needed this revenue stream. Millions could be made by taxing beer. There was controversy on whether the repeal should be a state or nationwide decision.

On March 22, 1933, President Franklin Roosevelt signed an amendment to the Volstead Act, known as the Cullen–Harrison Act, allowing the manufacture and sale of 3.2% beer (3.2% alcohol by weight, approximately 4% alcohol by volume) and light wines. The Volstead Act previously defined an intoxicating beverage as one with greater than 0.5% alcohol. Upon signing the Cullen–Harrison Act, Roosevelt remarked: "I think this would be a good time for a beer." According to a 2017 study in the journal Public Choice, representatives from traditional beer-producing states, as well as Democratic politicians, were most in favor of the bill, but politicians from many Southern states were most strongly opposed to the legislation.

The Eighteenth Amendment was repealed on December 5, 1933, with the ratification of the Twenty-first Amendment to the U.S. Constitution. Despite the efforts of Heber J. Grant, president of the Church of Jesus Christ of Latter-day Saints, the 21 Utah members of the constitutional convention voted unanimously on that day to ratify the Twenty-first Amendment, making Utah the 36th state to do so, and putting the repeal of the Eighteenth Amendment over the top in needed voting.

In the late 1930s, after its repeal, two-fifths of Americans wished to reinstate national Prohibition.

=== Post-repeal ===
An animated map of alcohol prohibition in the United States (1880–2025)

A map showing dry (red), wet (blue), and moist (yellow) counties in the United States as of March 2012. (See List of dry communities by U.S. state.)

The Twenty-first Amendment does not prevent states from restricting or banning alcohol; instead, it prohibits the "transportation or importation" of alcohol "into any State, Territory, or Possession of the United States [...] in violation of the laws thereof", thus allowing state and local control of alcohol. There are still numerous dry counties and municipalities in the United States that restrict or prohibit liquor sales.

Additionally, many tribal governments prohibit alcohol on Indian reservations. Federal law also prohibits alcohol on Indian reservations, although this law is currently only enforced when there is a concomitant violation of local tribal liquor laws.

After its repeal, some former supporters openly admitted failure. For example, John D. Rockefeller Jr. explained his view in a 1932 letter:

When Prohibition was introduced, I hoped that it would be widely supported by public opinion and the day would soon come when the evil effects of alcohol would be recognized. I have slowly and reluctantly come to believe that this has not been the result. Instead, drinking has generally increased; the speakeasy has replaced the saloon; a vast army of lawbreakers has appeared; many of our best citizens have openly ignored Prohibition; respect for the law has been greatly lessened, and crime has increased to a level never seen before.

Some historians claim that alcohol consumption in the United States did not exceed pre-Prohibition levels until the 1960s; others claim that alcohol consumption reached the pre-Prohibition levels several years after its enactment, and has continued to rise. Cirrhosis of the liver, a symptom of alcoholism, declined nearly two-thirds during Prohibition. In the decades after Prohibition, any stigma that had been associated with alcohol consumption was erased; according to a Gallup Poll survey conducted almost every year since 1939, two-thirds of American adults age 18 and older drink alcohol.

Shortly after World War II, a national opinion survey found that "About one-third of the people of the United States favor national prohibition." Upon repeal of national prohibition, 18 states continued prohibition at the state level. The last state, Mississippi, finally ended it in 1966. Almost two-thirds of all states adopted some form of local option which enabled residents in political subdivisions to vote for or against local prohibition. Therefore, despite the repeal of prohibition at the national level, 38% of the nation's population lived in areas with state or local prohibition.

In 2014, a CNN nationwide poll found that 81% of Americans thought that "the use of alcohol should be legal" while 18% did not.

== Christian views ==
Prohibition in the early to mid-20th century was mostly fueled by the Protestant denominations in the Southern United States, a region dominated by socially conservative evangelical Protestantism with a very high Christian church attendance. Generally, evangelical Protestant denominations encouraged prohibition, while the Mainline Protestant denominations disapproved of its introduction. There were exceptions to this, such as the Lutheran Church–Missouri Synod (German Confessional Lutherans), which is typically considered to be in scope of evangelical Protestantism.

Pietistic churches in the United States, especially Baptist churches, Methodists, Presbyterians, Congregationalists and others in the evangelical tradition, sought to end drinking and the saloon culture during the Third Party System. Liturgical ("high") churches, Catholic, Episcopal, German Lutheran and others in the mainline tradition, opposed prohibition laws because they did not want the government to reduce the definition of morality to a narrow standard or to criminalize the common liturgical practice of using wine.

Revivalism during the Second Great Awakening and the Third Great Awakening in the mid-to-late 19th century set the stage for the bond between Pietistic Protestantism and prohibition in the United States: "The greater prevalence of revival religion within a population, the greater support for the Prohibition parties within that population." Historian Nancy Koester argued that Prohibition was a "victory for progressives and social gospel activists battling poverty". Prohibition also united progressives and revivalists.

The temperance movement had popularized the belief that alcohol was the major cause of most personal and social problems and prohibition was seen as the solution to the nation's poverty, crime, violence, and other ills. Upon ratification of the amendment, the evangelist Billy Sunday said that "The slums will soon be only a memory. We will turn our prisons into factories and our jails into storehouses and corncribs." This reportedly did happen on a very limited scale: In the years after Iowa became a dry state in 1916, one Iowa town, Buck Grove, turned its jail into a toolhouse, while another sold its jail to a farmer.

== Effects ==
Indianapolis police after a raid on an illicit still, 1920

Prohibition led to the nearly total destruction of the liquor market. The public believed that Prohibition would be permanent, especially since no previous constitutional amendment had ever been repealed. Preceding events suggested that the federal government would put a limit on how much alcohol content drinks could have, or how much a person could consume, but eventually, Congress unreservedly outlawed liquor. The Volstead Act and the 18th Amendment together made it nearly impossible to distribute liquor or even possess drinks with more than "0.5% alcohol by volume".

Though the government did introduce conditions that would help ease the transition, the damage was unavoidable. It was thought that "eliminating the legal manufacture and sale of alcoholic drink would solve the major social and economic problems of American society." Prohibition was opposed by a diverse group before it went into effect. Bootlegging, the process of making illegal alcoholic beverages, quickly sprang up throughout the United States. Many participated in these practices. On the contrary, many individuals also decided to abide by the new radical laws. Some positive changes did come from Prohibition in the United States, but acceptance was not widespread enough to merit the challenges the country faced.

Due to the economic crashes caused by Prohibition, entire industries were shattered by the loss of trade routes and investors, creating a demand for alcoholic drinks that severely outranked the supply. The effect was that more and more strong liquors were produced and distributed by bootleggers. Consequently, the government had to find a way to increase enforcement and regulation but was faced with limited funding already, especially with the loss of tax revenue coming from the sale of liquor. These challenges led the government to try some more treacherous methods.

Prohibition enforcement mainly consisted of cutting off supply through smuggling and illegal manufacturing of alcoholic products. The government was highly effective at preventing alcohol from entering the country illegally, but bootleggers found a way around this. By stealing or making deals to acquire industrial alcohol, (from factories that made ink, cleaning chemicals, fuels, adhesives, and various other products) bootleggers were able to cut out the long process of fermentation to make alcohol. Instead, they combined the industrial alcohol with their customary flavorings to make alcoholic beverages in a more efficient process. Subsequently, they made more money and were able to meet the high demand for the products.

The Volstead Act, legislation to enforce the 18th Amendment, carried out countermeasures to this practice. The United States federal government poisoned alcohol during Prohibition. There are various perspectives about what steps the government took and how far they went with this plan. USA Today stated that the government went to "unethical lengths to prevent alcohol consumption". However, this source does not agree that the government directly poisoned drinking alcohol. Instead, it claims that the government indirectly poisoned citizens by denaturing industrial alcohol meant for manufacturing. Others believe that Congress hired chemists to combat the bootleggers who were using stolen industrial alcohol to make moonshine and other drinks.

Factories were obligated by law to denature their alcohol with chemicals that made it difficult to drink safely. In turn, bootleggers paid off the federal chemists and hired their own to neutralize the toxins in the alcohol. Eventually, the lack of obedience to the laws of Prohibition frustrated the government. The government invested more in their scientific processes, creating new blends to increase the toxicity of the chemicals in the industrial alcohol.

The federal government eventually found a denaturing formula that bootleggers were unable to work around, through adding a large amount of methyl alcohol; at the time, there was no reliable method to completely detoxify it. Soon after, the Treasury Department, under the direction of President Calvin Coolidge and Congress, mandated that industrial alcohol contain their newly discovered blend. Illicit beverages became very lethal, even with the efforts of bootlegger chemists to remove threats. A very small amount of undiluted methyl alcohol could kill a human being, and the effects were quickly realized. In 1926 New York City, 585 people died from this government action. Over 5,000 fatalities from this poisoning, at least a 600% increase from the previous deaths from alcohol, were said to have resulted in the entire country.

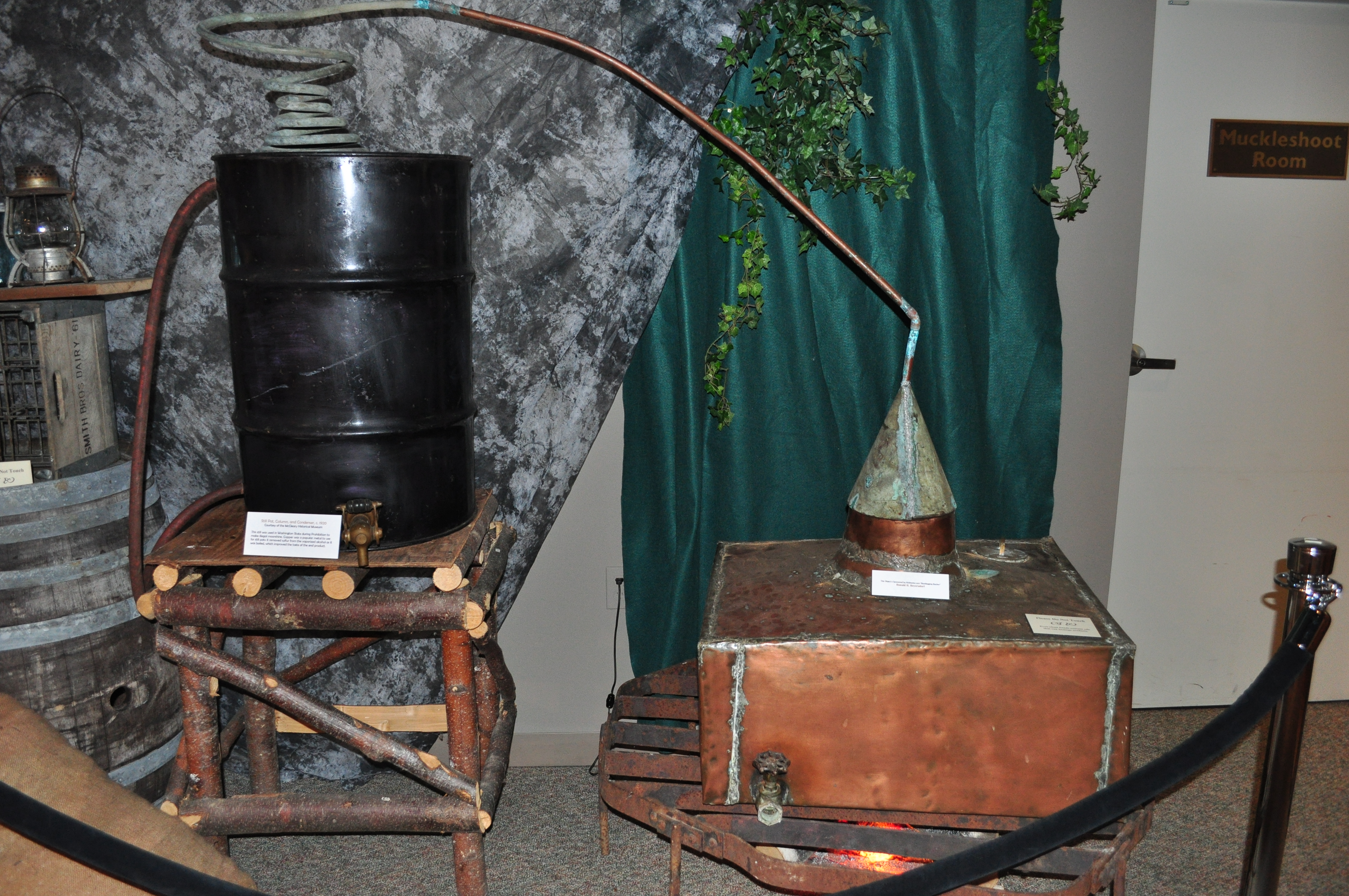
Bootlegging equipment for distilling and fermentation

Before the government started this process, bootleggers were already making alcoholic beverages unsafe for the public. These illicit liquor manufacturers found that by adding some questionable ingredients, they could simulate certain types of beverages they had enjoyed before prohibition, or create entirely new flavors. Some bootleggers added dead rats to their moonshine to make their alcohol taste like bourbon. Others used tar and oil from trees to replace gin and scotch. Contraband beer or wine was fairly easy to come by, unlike these new drinks. Concocting these flavors increased demand for their products. However, these practices made it very unhealthy to drink illegal alcohol. Many doctors saw frequent visits from those who became sick from drinking.

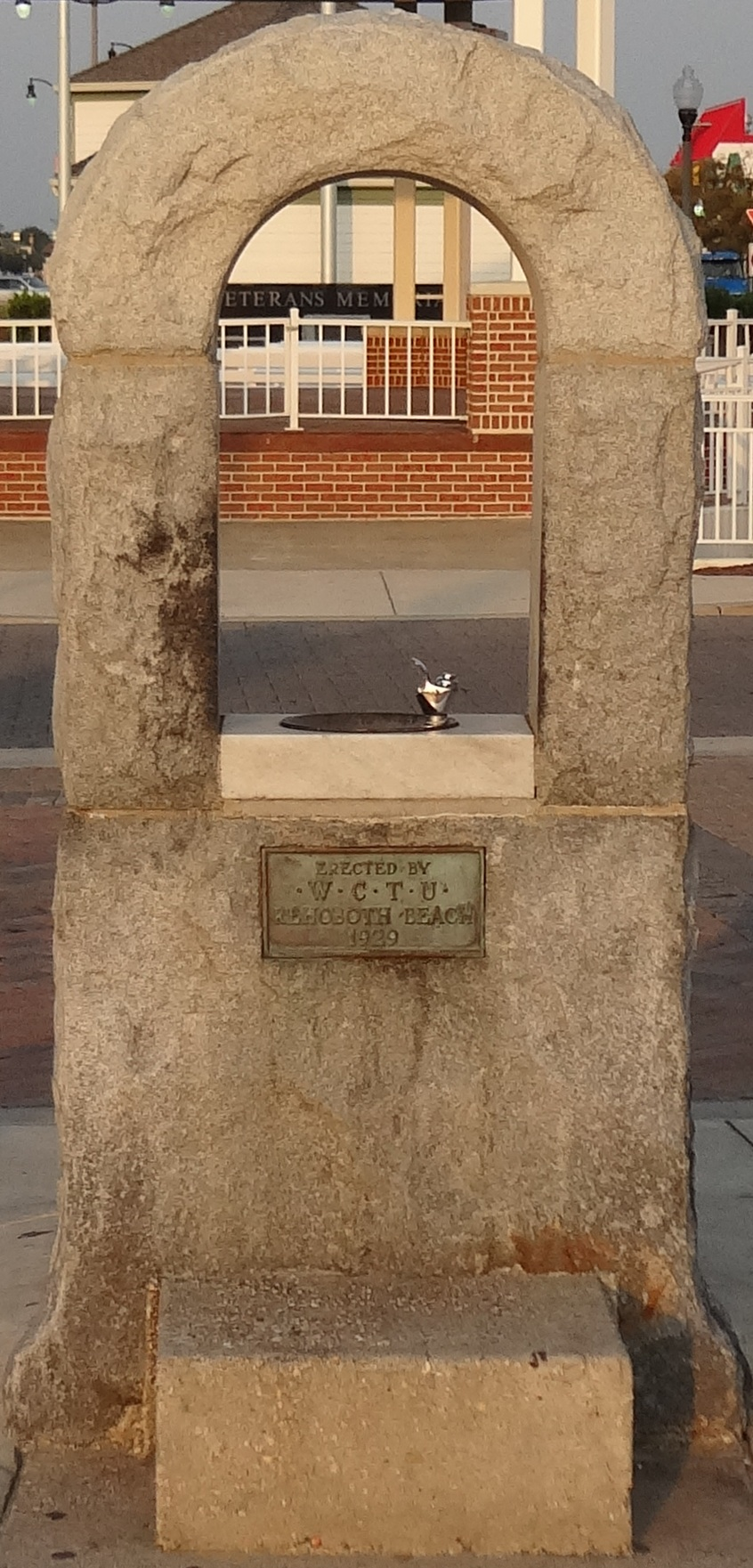
A temperance fountain erected by the Woman's Christian Temperance Union during the Prohibition era in Rehoboth Beach, Delaware

=== Alcohol consumption ===
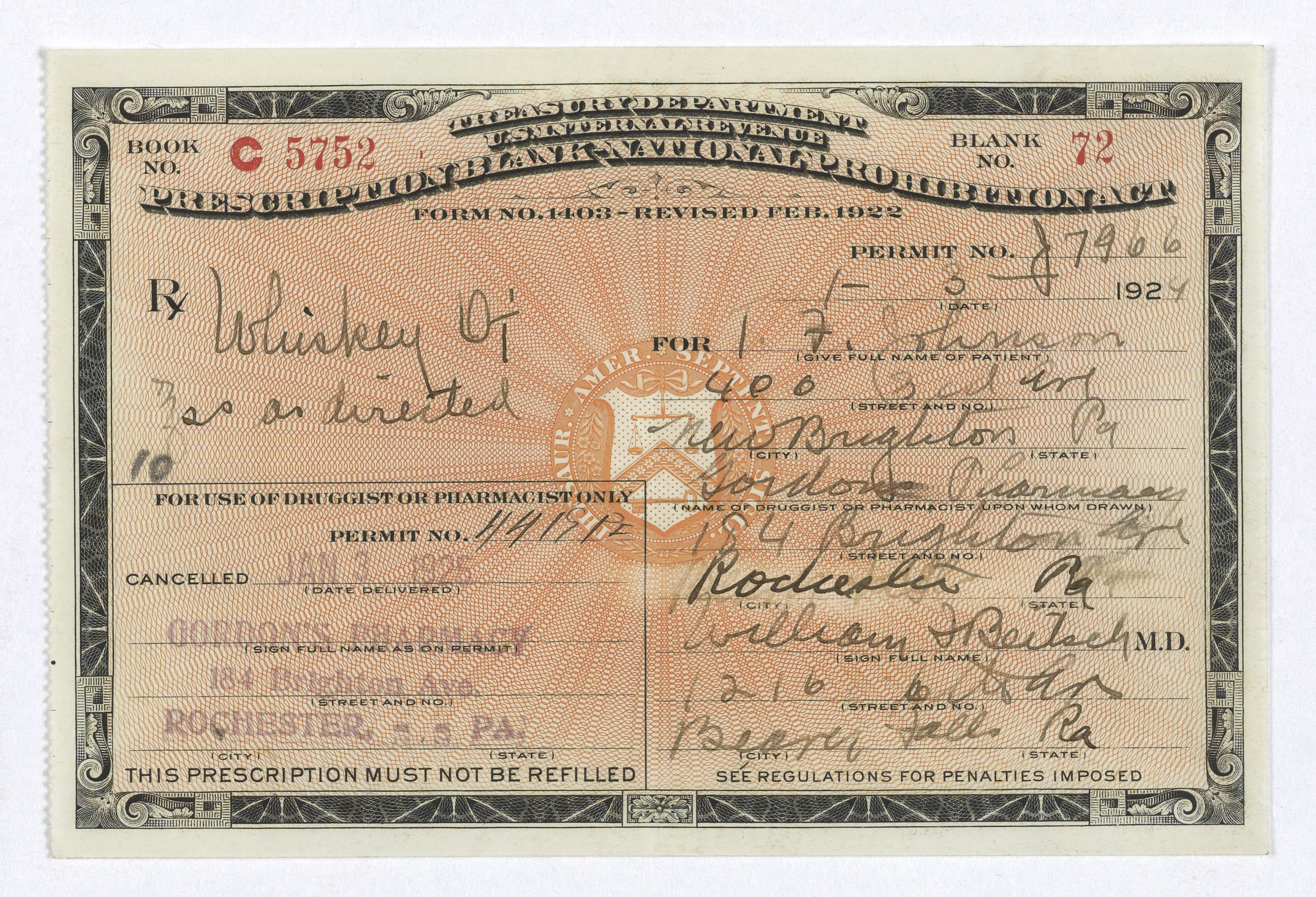
A prohibition-era prescription for whiskey

According to a 2010 review of the academic research on Prohibition, "[o]n balance, Prohibition probably reduced per capita alcohol use and alcohol-related harm, but these benefits eroded over time as an organized black market developed and public support for [Prohibition] declined." One study reviewing city-level drunkenness arrests concluded that prohibition had an immediate effect, but no long-term effect.

Another study examining "mortality, mental health and crime statistics" found that alcohol consumption fell, at first, to approximately 30 percent of its pre-Prohibition level, but over the next several years, increased to about 60–70 percent of its previous level. The Eighteenth Amendment prohibited the manufacture, sale and transportation of intoxicating beverages, however, it did not outlaw the possession or consumption of alcohol in the United States, which would allow legal loopholes for consumers possessing alcohol.

=== Health ===
Research indicates that rates of cirrhosis of the liver declined significantly during Prohibition and increased after Prohibition's repeal. According to the historian Jack S. Blocker Jr., "death rates from cirrhosis and alcoholism, alcoholic psychosis hospital admissions, and drunkenness arrests all declined steeply during the latter years of the 1910s, when both the cultural and the legal climate were increasingly inhospitable to drink, and in the early years after National Prohibition went into effect." Studies examining the rates of cirrhosis deaths as a proxy for alcohol consumption estimated a decrease in consumption of 10–20%.

National Institute on Alcohol Abuse and Alcoholism studies show clear epidemiological evidence that "overall cirrhosis mortality rates declined precipitously with the introduction of Prohibition," despite widespread flouting of the law. A 2024 study, which used variations in state legality of alcohol, found that individuals born in the 1930s in wet states had higher later-life mortality than those in dry states, suggesting adverse effects from in utero exposure to alcohol.

=== Crime ===
It is difficult to draw conclusions about Prohibition's effect on crime at the national level, as there were no uniform national statistics gathered about crime prior to 1930. It has been argued that organized crime received a major boost from Prohibition. For example, one study found that organized crime in Chicago tripled during Prohibition. Local criminal organizations had mostly limited their activities to prostitution, gambling, and theft until 1920, when organized "rum-running" or bootlegging emerged in response to Prohibition because a new, highly profitable black market for alcohol had emerged. Prohibition provided a financial basis for organized crime to flourish.

In one study of more than 30 major U.S. cities during the Prohibition years of 1920 and 1921, the number of crimes increased by 24%. Additionally, theft and burglaries increased by 9%, homicides by 13%, assaults and battery rose by 13%, drug addiction by 45%, and police department costs rose by 11.4%. This was largely the result of "black-market violence" and the diversion of law enforcement resources elsewhere. Despite the Prohibition movement's hope that outlawing alcohol would reduce crime, the reality was that the Volstead Act led to higher crime rates than were experienced prior to Prohibition and the establishment of a black market dominated by criminal organizations.

A 2016 NBER paper showed that South Carolina counties that enacted and enforced prohibition had homicide rates increase by about 30 to 60 percent relative to counties that did not enforce prohibition. A 2009 study found an increase in homicides in Chicago during Prohibition. However, some scholars have attributed the crime during the Prohibition era to increased urbanization, rather than to the criminalization of alcohol use. In some cities, such as New York City, crime rates decreased during the Prohibition era. Crime rates overall declined from the period of 1849 to 1951, making this decrease in crime during the Prohibition period less likely to be attributed to the criminalization of alcohol alone.

Mark H. Moore claims that contrary to popular opinion, "violent crime did not increase dramatically during Prohibition" and that organized crime "existed before and after" Prohibition. The historian Kenneth D. Rose corroborates historian John Burnham's assertion that during the 1920s "there is no firm evidence of this supposed upsurge in lawlessness" as "no statistics from this period dealing with crime are of any value whatsoever". California State University, Chico historian Kenneth D. Rose writes:

Opponents of prohibition were fond of claiming that the Great Experiment had created a gangster element that had unleashed a "crime wave" on a hapless America. The WONPR's Mrs. Coffin Van Rensselaer, for instance, insisted in 1932 that "the alarming crime wave, which had been piling up to unprecedented height" was a legacy of prohibition. But prohibition can hardly be held responsible for inventing crime, and while supplying illegal liquor proved to be lucrative, it was only an additional source of income to the more traditional criminal activities of gambling, loan sharking, racketeering, and prostitution. The notion of the prohibition-induced crime wave, despite its popularity during the 1920s, cannot be substantiated with any accuracy, because of the inadequacy of records kept by local police departments.

Along with other economic effects, the enactment and enforcement of Prohibition caused an increase in resource costs. During the 1920s the annual budget of the Bureau of Prohibition went from $4.4 million to $13.4 million. But this money didnt make much of a difference, with the Bureau being very poor trained, with over 60% of the workers failing their civil service exams. Additionally, the U.S. Coast Guard spent an average of $13 million annually on enforcement of prohibition laws. These numbers do not take into account the costs to local and state governments.

=== Powers of the state ===
According to Harvard University historian Lisa McGirr, Prohibition led to an expansion in the powers of the federal state, as well as helped shape the penal state. According to academic Colin Agur, Prohibition specifically increased the usage of telephone wiretapping by federal agents for evidence collection.

=== Discrimination ===
According to Harvard University historian Lisa McGirr, Prohibition had a disproportionately adverse effect on African-Americans, immigrants, and poor whites, as law enforcement used alcohol prohibition against these communities.

=== Economy ===
Different metrics have led to different assessments of Prohibition's impact on the U.S. economy.

Sources describe negative fiscal effects, with loss of tax revenue and increased enforcement costs, and economic impact on regulated and adjacent industries. Prohibition caused the loss of at least $226 million per annum in tax revenues on liquors alone. Supporters of the prohibition expected an increase in the sales of non-alcoholic beverages to replace the money made from alcohol sales, but this did not happen. "Prohibition caused the shutdown of over 200 distilleries, a thousand breweries, and over 170,000 liquor stores". It is worth noting that "the amount of money used to enforce prohibition started at $6.3 million in 1921 and rose to $13.4 million in 1930, almost double the original amount".

A 2015 study estimated that the repeal of Prohibition had a net social benefit of "$432 million per annum in 1934–1937, about 0.33% of gross domestic product. Total benefits of $3.25 billion consist primarily of increased consumer and producer surplus, tax revenues, and reduced criminal violence costs." When 3.2 percent alcohol beer was legalized in 1933, it created 81,000 jobs within a three-month span.

However, a 2021 study in the Journal of Economic History found that counties that adopted Prohibition early had greater population growth and an increase in farm real estate values.

During the Prohibition era, rates of absenteeism decreased from 10% to 3%. In Michigan, the Ford Motor Company documented "a decrease in absenteeism from 2,620 in April 1918 to 1,628 in May 1918".

=== Other effects ===
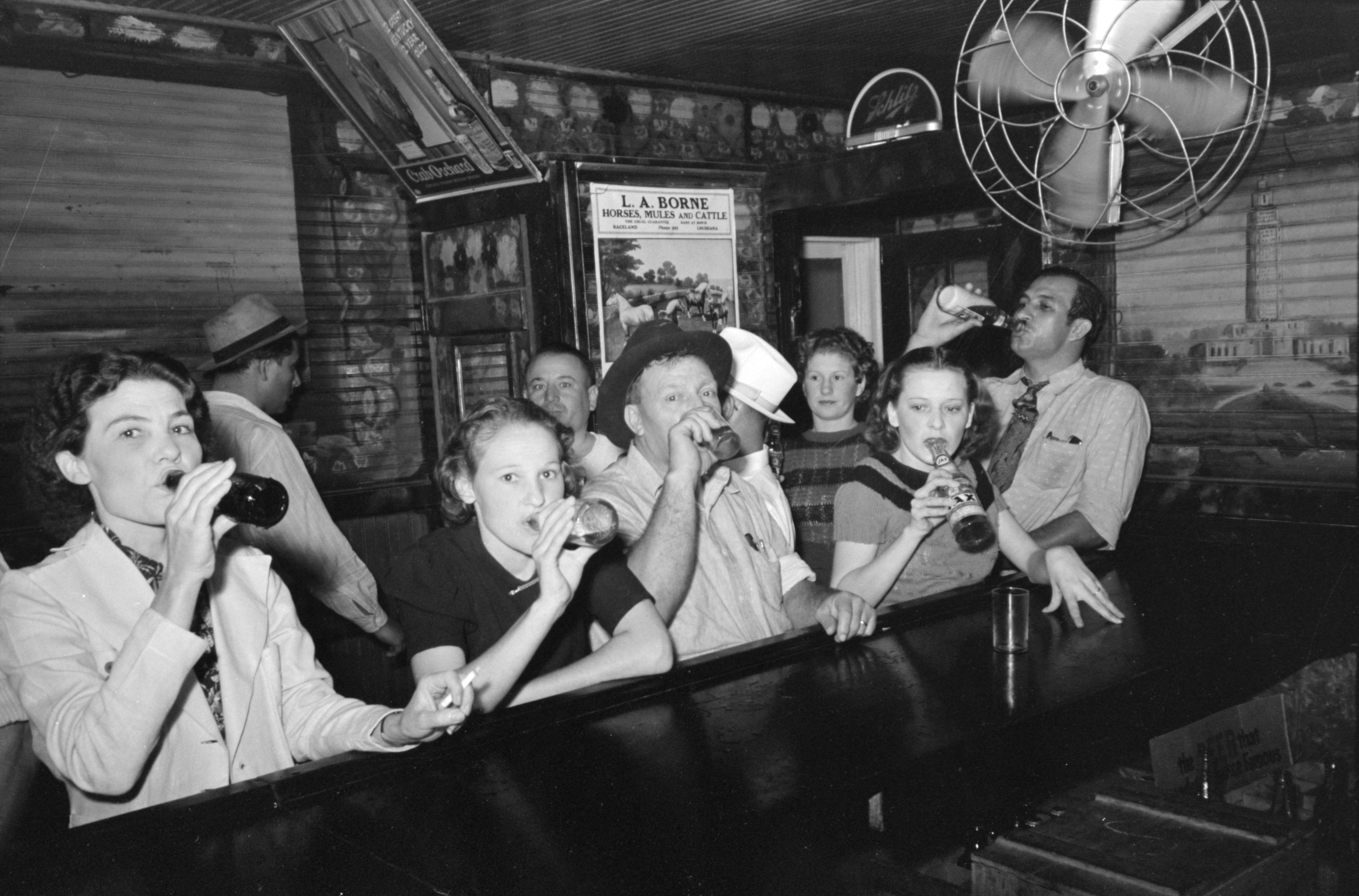
Men and women drinking beer at a bar in Raceland, Louisiana, in September 1938. Pre-Prohibition saloons were mostly male establishments; post-Prohibition bars catered to both males and females.

As saloons died out, public drinking lost much of its macho connotation, resulting in increased social acceptance of women drinking in the semi-public environment of the speakeasies. This new norm established women as a notable new target demographic for alcohol marketeers, who sought to expand their clientele. Women thus found their way into the bootlegging business, with some discovering that they could make a living by selling alcohol with a minimal likelihood of suspicion by law enforcement. Before prohibition, women who drank publicly in saloons or taverns, especially outside of urban centers like Chicago or New York, were seen as immoral or were likely to be prostitutes.

Heavy drinkers and alcoholics were among the most affected groups during Prohibition. Those who were determined to find liquor could still do so, but those who saw their drinking habits as destructive typically had difficulty in finding the help they sought. Self-help societies had withered away along with the alcohol industry. In 1935 a new self-help group called Alcoholics Anonymous (AA) was founded.

Prohibition also had an effect on the music industry in the United States, specifically with jazz. Speakeasies became very popular, and the Great Depression's migratory effects led to the dispersal of jazz music, from New Orleans going north through Chicago and to New York. This led to the development of different styles in different cities. Due to its popularity in speakeasies and the emergence of advanced recording technology, jazz's popularity skyrocketed. It was also at the forefront of the minimal integration efforts going on at the time, as it united mostly black musicians with mostly white audiences.

A 2025 study linked prohibition of alcohol to increased coffee consumption in the United States.

==== Alcohol production ====
Making moonshine was an industry in the American South before and after Prohibition. In the 1950s muscle cars became popular and various roads became known as "Thunder Road" for their use by moonshiners. A popular song was created and the legendary drivers, cars, and routes were depicted on film in Thunder Road.

As a result of Prohibition, the advancements of industrialization within the alcoholic beverage industry were essentially reversed. Large-scale alcohol producers were shut down, for the most part, and some individual citizens took it upon themselves to produce alcohol illegally, essentially reversing the efficiency of mass-producing and retailing alcoholic beverages. Closing the country's manufacturing plants and taverns also resulted in an economic downturn for the industry. While the Eighteenth Amendment did not have this effect on the industry due to its failure to define an "intoxicating" beverage, the Volstead Act's definition of 0.5% or more alcohol by volume shut down the brewers, who expected to continue to produce beer of moderate strength.

In 1930 the Prohibition Commissioner estimated that in 1919, the year before the Volstead Act became law, the average drinking American spent $17 per year on alcoholic beverages. By 1930, because enforcement diminished the supply, spending had increased to $35 per year. There was no inflation in this period. The result was an illegal alcohol beverage industry that made an average of $3 billion per year in illegal untaxed income.

The Volstead Act specifically allowed individual farmers to make certain wines "on the legal fiction that it was a non-intoxicating fruit-juice for home consumption", and many did so. Enterprising grape farmers produced liquid and semi-solid grape concentrates, often called "wine bricks" or "wine blocks". This demand led California grape growers to increase their land under cultivation by about 700% during the first five years of Prohibition. The grape concentrate was sold with a "warning": "After dissolving the brick in a gallon of water, do not place the liquid in a jug away in the cupboard for twenty days, because then it will turn into wine".

The Volstead Act allowed the sale of sacramental wine to priests and ministers and allowed rabbis to approve sales of kosher wine to individuals for Sabbath and holiday use at home. Among Jews, four rabbinical groups were approved, which led to some competition for membership, since the supervision of sacramental licenses could be used to secure donations to support a religious institution. There were known abuses in this system, with people pretending to be rabbis to obtain more wine. With these people faking to rabbis they lied about the amount of people attending their congregations, which made it so they could get more alcohol. And with more alcohol out there led to these people selling it illegally.

Prohibition had a notable effect on the alcohol brewing industry in the United States. Wine historians note that Prohibition destroyed what was a fledgling wine industry in the United States. Productive, wine-quality grapevines were replaced by lower-quality vines that grew thicker-skinned grapes, which could be more easily transported. Much of the institutional knowledge was also lost as winemakers either emigrated to other wine-producing countries or left the business altogether. Distilled spirits became more popular during Prohibition. Because their alcohol content was higher than that of fermented wine and beer, spirits were often diluted with non-alcoholic drinks.

== See also ==
- Cultural and religious foundation
  - Bootleggers and Baptists
  - Christian views on alcohol
  - Ethnocultural politics in the United States
  - Moral panic
  - Teetotalism
  - Women's suffrage in the United States
- Controlled substances
  - Beer in the United States
  - Ethanol
  - Moonshine
- Legal foundation
  - Drug prohibition
  - Dry county
  - Dry state
  - Webb-Kenyon Act
  - Medicinal Liquor Prescriptions Act
  - Legal drinking age
  - Prohibition
  - Prohibition in Canada
  - Repeal of Prohibition
- Lawbreakers and illegal practices
  - American gangsters during the 1920s
  - Chicago Outfit
  - Rum-running
  - Organized crime
  - The Purple Gang
- Places involved in smuggling
  - Free State of Galveston
  - Govenlock, Saskatchewan
  - Whiskey Gap, Alberta
- Law-enforcement organizations
  - Izzy Einstein and Moe Smith
  - The Untouchables
  - Bureau of Alcohol, Tobacco, Firearms and Explosives (ATF)
  - Bureau of Prohibition
  - United States Coast Guard
  - United States Customs and Border Protection
  - U.S. Immigration and Customs Enforcement (ICE)
- Similar policies and institutions
  - War on drugs
  - Controlled Substances Act
  - Drug Enforcement Administration
  - Harrison Narcotics Act
  - ONDCP
  - OCDETF

== Bibliography ==
- Blocker, Jack S., ed. (2003). Alcohol and Temperance in Modern History: An International Encyclopedia. ABC-CLIO. p. 23. ISBN 978-1-57607-833-4. Archived from the original on January 20, 2023.
- Burns, Ken; Novick, Lynn (October 2011). Prohibition. PBS. ISBN 978-1-60883-430-3. OCLC 738476083. Archived from the original on December 25, 2020.
- Davis, Marni (2012). Jews and Booze: Becoming American in the Age of Prohibition. NYU Press. ISBN 978-0-8147-2028-8. JSTOR j.ctt16gzq64.
- Haygood, Atticus G. Close the Saloons: A Plea for Prohibition. 8th ed. Macon, GA: J.W. Burke, 1880.
- Jensen, Richard J. (1971). The Winning of the Midwest: Social and Political Conflict, 1888–1896. U of Chicago Press. ISBN 978-0-226-39825-9.
- Kingsdale, Jon M. (1973). "The 'Poor Man's Club': Social Functions of the Urban Working-Class Saloon". American Quarterly. 25 (4): 472–489. doi:10.2307/2711634. JSTOR 2711634.
- Kyvig, David E. Law, Alcohol, and Order: Perspectives on National Prohibition Greenwood Press, 1985.
- Kyvig, David E. Repealing National Prohibition. Chicago: The University of Chicago Press, 1979.
- Lender, Mark, ed. Dictionary of American Temperance Biography Greenwood Press, 1984.
- Lusk, Rufus S. (September 1932). "The Drinking Habit". The Annals of the American Academy of Political and Social Science. 163 (1): 46–52. doi:10.1177/000271623216300106. JSTOR 1017684.
- Miron, Jeffrey A.; Zwiebel, Jeffrey (1991). "Alcohol Consumption During Prohibition". The American Economic Review. 81 (2): 242–247. JSTOR 2006862. ProQuest 233046358.
- Miron, Jeffrey. "Alcohol Prohibition" Archived May 25, 2017, at the Wayback Machine. EH.Net Encyclopedia, edited by Robert Whaples. September 24, 2001.
- Moore, Leonard J. (1990). "Historical Interpretations of the 1920's Klan: The Traditional View and the Populist Revision". Journal of Social History. 24 (2): 341–357. doi:10.1353/jsh/24.2.341. JSTOR 3787502.
- Sellman, J. C. (March 1999). "Social Movements and the Symbolism of Public Demonstrations: The 1874 Women's Crusade and German Resistance in Richmond, Indiana". Journal of Social History. 32 (3): 557–588. doi:10.1353/jsh/32.3.557. JSTOR 3789342. Gale A54258701.
- Rumbarger, John J. Profits, Power, and Prohibition: Alcohol Reform and the Industrializing of America, 1800–1930, State University of New York Press, 1989.
- Sinclair, Andrew. Prohibition: The Era of Excess 1962.
- Timberlake, James. Prohibition and the Progressive Movement, 1900–1920 Harvard University Press, 1963.
- Tracy, Sarah W. and Acker, Caroline J. Altering American Consciousness: The History of Alcohol and Drug Use in the United States, 1800–2000. University of Massachusetts Press, 2004
- Walsh, Victor A. (1990). "'Drowning the Shamrock': Drink, Teetotalism, and the Irish Catholics of Gilded-Age Pittsburgh". Journal of American Ethnic History. 10 (1/2): 60–79. JSTOR 27500800.
- Welskopp, Thomas (January 2013). "Bottom of the barrel". Behemoth. 6 (1). doi:10.1515/behemoth-2013-0004.
- Willing, Joseph K. (May 1926). "The Profession of Bootlegging". Annals of the American Academy of Political and Social Science. 125: 40–48. doi:10.1177/000271622612500106.
- Allsop, Kenneth (1970). The Bootleggers: The Story of Chicago's Prohibition Era. Arlington House. ISBN 978-0-87000-094-2.
- Baier, Lowell E. (2022). Federalism, Preemption, and the Nationalization of American Wildlife Management: The Dynamic Balance Between State and Federal Authority. Bloomsbury. ISBN 978-1-5381-6491-4.
