= Repeal of Prohibition in the United States =

End of alcohol ban in 1933

In the United States, the nationwide ban on alcoholic beverages was repealed by the passage of the Twenty-first Amendment to the United States Constitution on December 5, 1933.

== Background ==
In 1919, the requisite number of state legislatures ratified the Eighteenth Amendment to the United States Constitution, enabling national prohibition one year later. Many women, notably members of the Woman's Christian Temperance Union, were pivotal in bringing about national Prohibition in the United States, believing it would protect families, women, and children from the effects of alcohol abuse. Around 1820, "the typical adult white American male consumed nearly a half pint of whiskey a day". Historian W. J. Rorabaugh, writing on the factors that brought about the start of the temperance movement, and later, Prohibition in the United States, states:

As whiskey consumption rose after the American Revolution, it attracted attention. Medical doctors were among the first to notice the increase. More patients were having the shakes from involuntary withdrawal from alcohol, delirium tremens nightmares and psychoses were on the rise, and solo drinking of massive quantities in binges that ended with the drinker passing out became the new drinking pattern. Doctors such as Benjamin Rush, a signer of the Declaration of Independence and onetime chief physician of the Continental Army, who had first warned against the overuse of whiskey and other distilled spirits during the Revolution, became alarmed. Experts recognized that over time, drinkers needed to increase their use of alcohol to gain the same sense of euphoric satisfaction from drinking. Down that road was chronic drunkenness or what would later be called alcoholism. Medical schools included warnings to students, but most physicians in the early 1800s believed that alcohol was an important medicine. Physicians especially favored laudanum, which was opium dissolved in alcohol. Laudanum calmed the nerves and miraculously ended the craving for alcohol. Children's nurses used laudanum to quiet babies. To Rush, the issue was not just about health. He published many newspaper articles and pamphlets hostile to distilled spirits. His best known work, An Inquiry into the Effects of Spirituous Liquors (1784), went through at least twenty-one editions and had sold 170,000 copies by 1850. The Philadelphia doctor argued that democracy would be perverted and ultimately destroyed if voters were drunken sots. Public safety in a republic required an electorate capable of wise judgment about political matters. Drunkenness made for bad voters. Rush and others also worried about how distilled spirits damaged society in terms of crime, poverty, and family violence. Many serious crimes, including murder, were committed under the influence of alcohol. The unemployed or unemployable drunkard abandoned his family so that the wife and children sometimes faced starvation while the husband and father debauched himself. Liquor use was often associated with gambling and prostitution, which brought financial ruin and sexually transmitted diseases. Drunkenness also led to wife beating and child abuse. To many Americans, it appeared that the United States could not be a successful republic unless alcoholic passions were curbed.

The proponents of National Prohibition believed that banning alcoholic beverages would reduce or even eliminate many social problems, particularly drunkenness, domestic violence, crime, mental illness, and secondary poverty.

== Impact of prohibition ==
Scholarly literature regarding the effect of prohibition is mixed, with some writers insisting that the popular claim that prohibition was a failure is false. Prohibition was successful in reducing the amount of liquor consumed, cirrhosis death rates, admissions to state mental hospitals for alcoholic psychosis, arrests for public drunkenness, and rates of absenteeism.

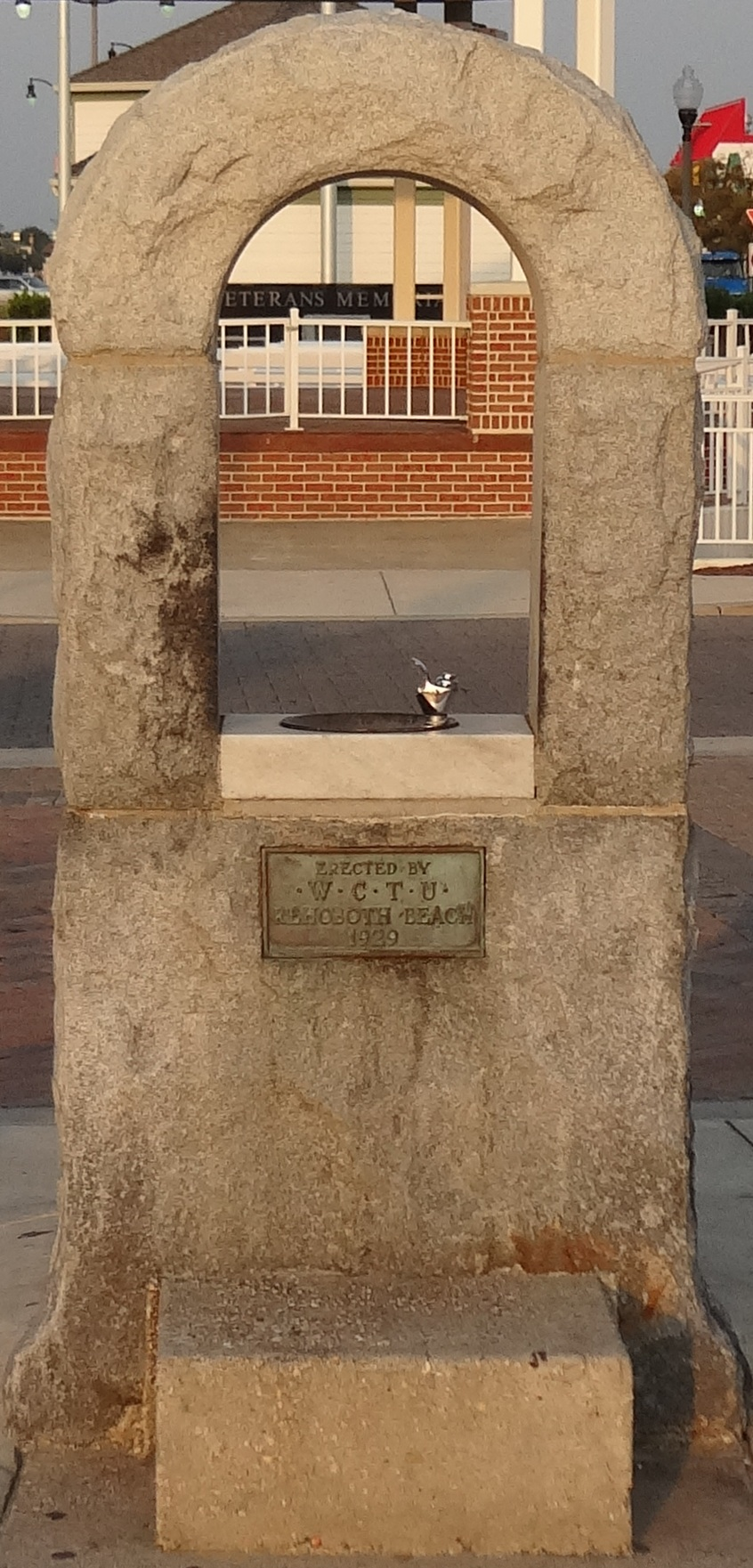
A temperance fountain erected by the Woman's Christian Temperance Union during the Prohibition era in Rehoboth Beach, Delaware

Mark H. Moore, a professor at Harvard University Kennedy School of Government, stated, with respect to the effects of prohibition:

Alcohol consumption declined dramatically during Prohibition. Cirrhosis death rates for men were 29.5 per 100,000 in 1911 and 10.7 in 1929. Admissions to state mental hospitals for alcoholic psychosis declined from 10.1 per 100,000 in 1919 to 4.7 in 1928. Arrests for public drunkenness and disorderly conduct declined 50 percent between 1916 and 1922. For the population as a whole, the best estimates are that consumption of alcohol declined by 30 percent to 50 percent.

Specifically, "rates for cirrhosis of the liver fell by 50 percent early in Prohibition and recovered promptly after Repeal in 1933." Moore also found that contrary to popular opinion, "violent crime did not increase dramatically during Prohibition" and that organized crime "existed before and after" Prohibition. The historian Jack S. Blocker Jr. stated that "Death rates from cirrhosis and alcoholism, alcoholic psychosis hospital admissions, and drunkenness arrests all declined steeply during the latter years of the 1910s, when both the cultural and the legal climate were increasingly inhospitable to drink, and in the early years after National Prohibition went into effect." In addition, "once Prohibition became the law of the land, many citizens decided to obey it". During the Prohibition era, rates of absenteeism decreased from 10% to 3%. In Michigan, the Ford Motor Company documented "a decrease in absenteeism from 2,620 in April 1918 to 1,628 in May 1918."

Journalist H. L. Mencken, writing in 1925, believed the opposite to be true:

Five years of Prohibition have had, at least, this one benign effect: they have completely disposed of all the favorite arguments of the Prohibitionists. None of the great boons and usufructs that were to follow the passage of the Eighteenth Amendment has come to pass. There is not less drunkenness in the Republic, but more. There is not less crime, but more. There is not less insanity, but more. The cost of government is not smaller, but vastly greater. Respect for law has not increased, but diminished.

Some supporters of Prohibition, such as Charles Stelzle who wrote Why Prohibition! (1918), believed that prohibition would eventually lead to reductions in taxes, since drinking "produced half the business" for institutions supported by tax dollars such as courts, jails, hospitals, almshouses, and insane asylums. In fact, alcohol consumption and the incidence of alcohol-related domestic violence were decreasing before the Eighteenth Amendment was adopted. Following the imposition of Prohibition, reformers "were dismayed to find that child neglect and violence against children actually increased during the Prohibition era."

Kenneth D. Rose, a professor of history at California State University, says that 'the WONPR claimed that prohibition had nurtured a criminal class, created a "crime wave," corrupted public officials, made drinking fashionable, engendered a contempt for rule of law, and set back the progress of "true temperance."' Rose, however, states that a "prohibition crime wave was rooted in the impressionistic rather than the factual." He writes:

Opponents of prohibition were fond of claiming that the Great Experiment had created a gangster element that had unleashed a "crime wave" on a hapless America. The WONPR's Mrs. Coffin Van Rensselaer, for instance, insisted in 1932 that "the alarming crime wave, which had been piling up to unprecedented height" was a legacy of prohibition. But prohibition can hardly be held responsible for inventing crime, and while supplying illegal liquor proved to be lucrative, it was only an additional source of income to the more traditional criminal activities of gambling, loan sharking, racketeering, and prostitution. The notion of the prohibition-induced crime wave, despite its popularity during the 1920s, cannot be substantiated with any accuracy, because of the inadequacy of records kept by local police departments.

Prohibitionists argued that Prohibition would be more effective if enforcement were increased. However, David E. Kyvig claims that increased efforts to enforce Prohibition simply resulted in the government spending more money, rather than less. The economic cost of Prohibition became especially pronounced during the Great Depression. According to two organizations advocating against Prohibition, Association Against the Prohibition Amendment (AAPA) and Women's Organization for National Prohibition Reform (WONPR), an estimated $861 million was lost in federal tax revenue from untaxed liquor; $40 million was spent annually on Prohibition enforcement. The AAPA also released a pamphlet claiming that $11 billion was lost in federal liquor-tax revenue and $310 million was spent on Prohibition enforcement from 1920 to 1931. This lack of potential funding during a period of economic strife became a crucial part of the campaign for repeal.

== Organized opposition ==
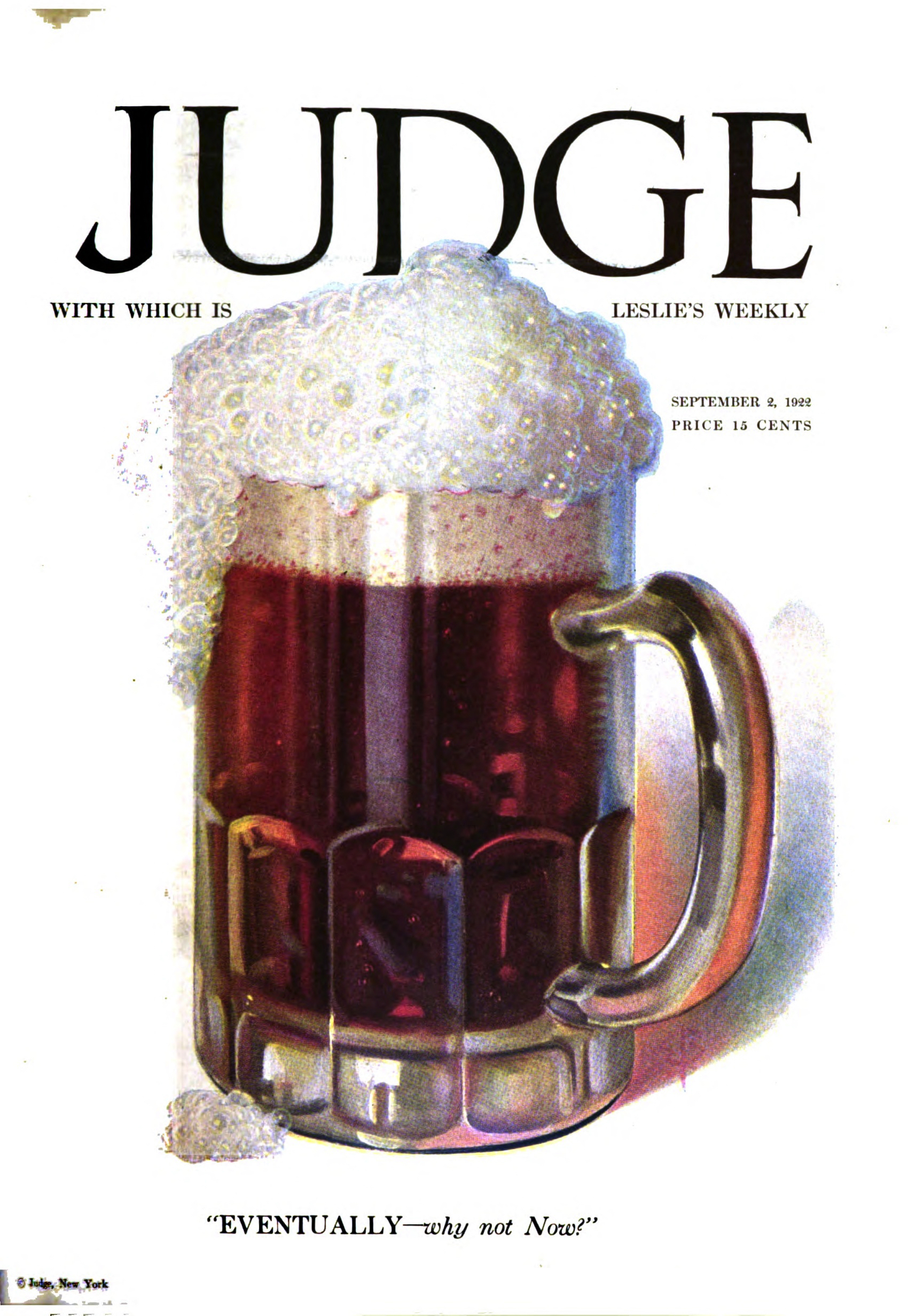
"Eventually – why not Now? (Judge, 2 Sep 1922)

During this period, support for Prohibition diminished among voters and politicians. John D. Rockefeller Jr., a lifelong nondrinker who had contributed between $350,000 and $700,000 to the Anti-Saloon League, announced his support for repeal because of the widespread problems he believed Prohibition had caused. Influential leaders, such as the du Pont brothers, led the Association Against the Prohibition Amendment, whose name clearly asserted its intentions.

The repeal movement also attracted a substantial portion of women, defying the assumption that recently enfranchised female voters would automatically vote as a bloc on this issue. They became pivotal in the effort to repeal, as many "had come to the painful conclusion that the destructiveness of alcohol was now embodied in Prohibition itself." By then, women had become even more politically powerful due to ratification of the Nineteenth Amendment in support of women's suffrage. Activist Pauline Sabin argued that repeal would protect families from the corruption, violent crime, and underground drinking that resulted from Prohibition. On May 28, 1929, Sabin founded the Women's Organization for National Prohibition Reform (WONPR), which attracted many former Prohibitionists to its ranks. By the time repeal was finally passed in 1933 the WONPR's membership was estimated at 1.5 million. Originally, Sabin was among the many women who supported the Eighteenth Amendment. Now, however, she viewed Prohibition as both hypocritical and dangerous. She recognized "the apparent decline of temperate drinking" and feared the rise of organized crime that developed around bootlegging.

Additionally, Sabin worried that America's children, witnessing a blatant disregard for dry laws, would cease to recognize the sanctity of the law itself. Finally, Sabin and the WONPR took a libertarian stance that disapproved of federal involvement in a personal matter like drinking. Over time, however, the WONPR modified its argument, playing up the "moral wrongs that threatened the American home" as a result of the corruption of the Prohibition era. As a women's organization during the early 20th century, adopting a political stance that centered around maternalism and home protection appealed to the widest audience and was favored over personal liberty arguments, which ultimately received little attention.

The WONPR was initially composed mainly of upper-class women. However, by the time the Twenty-first Amendment was passed, their membership included the middle and working classes. After a short start-up period, donations from members alone were enough to financially sustain the organization. By 1931, more women belonged to the WONPR than the Woman's Christian Temperance Union (WCTU); by 1932, the WONPR had branches in forty-one states.

The WONPR supported repeal on a platform of "true" temperance, claiming that "a trend toward moderation and restraint in the use of intoxicating beverages [was] reversed by prohibition." Though their causes were in direct opposition, the WONPR mirrored the advocacy techniques of the WCTU. They canvassed door-to-door, encouraged politicians on all levels to incorporate repeal into their party platform, created petitions, gave speeches and radio interviews, dispersed persuasive literature, and held chapter meetings. At times, the WONPR also worked in cooperation with other anti-prohibition groups. In 1932 the AAPA, Voluntary Committee of Lawyers, The Crusaders, the American Hotel Organization, and the WONPR formed the United Repeal Council. The United Repeal Council lobbied at both the Republican and Democratic national conventions in 1932 to integrate repeal into their respective presidential election campaigns. Ultimately, the Republicans continued to defend Prohibition. The WONPR, which initially began as a nonpartisan organization, joined with the Democratic campaign and supported Franklin Roosevelt.

The number of repeal organizations and demand for repeal both increased.

=== Organizations supporting repeal ===
- Association Against the Prohibition Amendment
- Constitutional Liberty League of Massachusetts, a nationwide organization despite its name
- The Crusaders
- Labor's National Committee for Modification of the Volstead Act
- Moderation League of New York, a nationwide organization despite its name
- Molly Pitcher Club
- Republican Citizens Committee Against National Prohibition
- United Repeal Council
- Voluntary Committee of Lawyers
- Women's Committee for Repeal of the 18th Amendment
- Women's Moderation Union
- Women's Organization for National Prohibition Reform

==== Organization leaders ====
- Nicholas Murray Butler
- Joseph H. Choate Jr.
- Fred Clark
- Henry Curran
- Lammot du Pont II
- Pierre S. du Pont
- Henry Bourne Joy
- Colonel Robert McCormick
- Grayson Murphy
- Thomas W. Phillips
- Raymond Pitcairn
- John J. Raskob
- Pauline Sabin
- Jouett Shouse
- William H. Stayton
- James Wadsworth
- Matthew Woll

=== Organizations opposing repeal ===
- Anti-Saloon League (now the American Council on Alcohol Problems)
- Catholic Total Abstinence Union of America
- Independent Order of Good Templars (IOGT)
- Independent Order of Rechabites (IOR)
- Methodist Board of Temperance, Prohibition, and Public Morals
- Prohibition Party
- Woman's Christian Temperance Union (WCTU)

== Repeal as a political party issue ==
In 1932, the Democratic Party's platform included a plank for the repeal of Prohibition, and Democratic candidate Franklin D. Roosevelt ran for president of the United States promising repeal of federal Prohibition laws.

A. Mitchell Palmer used his expertise as the Attorney General who first enforced Prohibition to promote a plan to expedite its repeal through state conventions rather than the state legislatures.

== Repeal ==
1933 newsreel

The Cullen–Harrison Act, signed by President Franklin D. Roosevelt on March 22, 1933, authorized the sale of 3.2 percent beer (thought to be too low an alcohol concentration to be intoxicating) and wine, which allowed the first legal beer sales since the beginning of Prohibition on January 16, 1920. In 1933 state conventions ratified the Twenty-first Amendment, which repealed Prohibition. The Amendment was fully ratified on December 5, 1933. Federal laws enforcing Prohibition were then repealed.

=== Dry counties ===
Following repeal some states continued prohibition within their own jurisdictions. Almost two-thirds of the states adopted some form of local option which enabled residents in political subdivisions to vote for or against local prohibition. For a time, 38 percent of Americans lived in areas with Prohibition. By 1966, however, all states had repealed their statewide prohibition laws, with Mississippi the last state to do so.

== Sources ==
- Walker, Robert S. and Samuel C. Patterson, Oklahoma Goes Wet: The Repeal of Prohibition, Eagleton Institute, Rutgers University, (1961). Blocker, Jack S. (1976). Retreat From Reform : The Prohibition Movement in the United States, 1890–1913. Contributions in American History. Vol. 51. Westport, Connecticut: Greenwood Press. ISBN 978-0837188997.
- Kyvig, David E. (1979). Repealing National Prohibition. Chicago, Illinois: University of Chicago Press. ISBN 978-0226466415.
- Kyvig, David E. (Autumn 1976). "Women against Prohibition". American Quarterly. 28 (4): 465–482. doi:10.2307/2712541. JSTOR 2712541.
- Pollard, Joseph P. (1932). The Road to Repeal: Submission to Conventions. New York: Brentano's.
- Rose, Kenneth D. (1996). American Women and the Repeal of Prohibition. American Social Experience Series. Vol. 33. New York: New York University Press. ISBN 978-0585136301.
- Tietsort, Francis J., ed. (1929). Temperance – or Prohibition?. New York: The Hearst Temperance Contest Committee.
- Willebrandt, Mabel Walker; Elizabeth A Smart; Edward C Sturges (1929). The Inside of Prohibition. Indianapolis, Indiana: Bobbs-Merrill.
