= Dry state =

US state in which alcohol was prohibited

Animated map of alcohol prohibition in the United States 1880 – 2025

A dry state was a state in the United States in which the manufacture, distribution, importation, and sale of alcoholic beverages was prohibited or tightly restricted. Some states, such as North Dakota, entered the United States as dry states, and others went dry after the passage of prohibition legislation or the Volstead Act. No state remains completely dry, but some states do contain dry counties.

Prior to the adoption of nationwide prohibition in 1920, state legislatures passed local option laws that allowed a county or township to go dry if it chose to do so. The Maine law, passed in 1851 in Maine, was among the first statutory implementations of the developing temperance movement in the United States.

Following Maine's lead, prohibition laws were soon passed in the states of Delaware, Ohio, Illinois, Rhode Island, Minnesota, Massachusetts, Connecticut, Pennsylvania and New York; however, all but one were repealed. The debate over prohibition increased in the United States during the late nineteenth and early twentieth century as the drys, including the Woman's Christian Temperance Union (WCTU), the National Prohibition Party, the Anti-Saloon League, and others, continued to support temperance and prohibition legislation, while the wets opposed it. By 1913 nine states had statewide prohibition and 31 others had local option laws, placing more than 50 percent of the United States population under some form of alcohol prohibition.

Following two unsuccessful attempts at national prohibition legislation (one in 1913 and the other in 1915), Congress approved a resolution on December 19, 1917, to prohibit the manufacture, sale, transportation, and importation of alcoholic beverages in the United States. The resolution was sent to the states for ratification and became the Eighteenth Amendment to the United States Constitution. On January 8, 1918, Mississippi became the first state to ratify the amendment and on January 16, 1919, Nebraska became the 36th state to do so, securing its passage with the required three-fourths of the states. By the end of February 1919, only three states remained as hold-outs to ratification: New Jersey, Connecticut and Rhode Island.

The National Prohibition Act, also known as the Volstead Act, was enacted on October 18, 1919. Prohibition in the United States went into effect on January 17, 1920, but quickly lost popularity as the illegal sale of alcohol flourished, leading to a growth in organized crime. Nationwide prohibition was repealed in 1933 with the passage of the Twenty-first Amendment on February 20 and its ratification on December 5. The Twenty-first Amendment explicitly allowed states to continue banning alcohol as before, with the importation of alcohol into those states becoming a federal offense. However, most of these states repealed their own prohibition laws for the same reasons in the years that followed. The last "dry state" was Mississippi, which removed its statewide ban on the sale of alcohol in 1966.

== List of formerly dry states ==
This table lists the effective dates each state went dry and any dates of repeal that do not coincide with the end of national prohibition in 1933.

State	Dry date	Repeal date			Ref
State	Dry date	Retail sales		On-premise	
State	Dry date	Beer	Liquor		
Maine	1851	1856			
Maine	1858	1934			
Vermont	1853	1902			
Kansas	November 23, 1880	1937	1948	1987	
Iowa	July 27, 1882	1894			
Iowa	January 1, 1916	1934			
North Dakota	November 2, 1889	October 22, 1933	November 1936		
South Dakota	October 1, 1889	1896			
South Dakota	November 7, 1916	1933			
Oklahoma	September 17, 1907	June 16, 1933	April 7, 1959	September 18, 1984	
Georgia	January 1, 1908	1938			
Mississippi	December 31, 1908	February 26, 1934	June 30, 1966 (Note: The repeal of the statewide ban did not immediately lead to the legalization of alcohol sales in any part of Mississippi. When the Alcohol Beverage Control Law took effect on July 1, 1966, the ban remained in place in all counties, but each county was permitted to hold its own referendum to decide whether to allow alcohol to be sold within its borders. The first of these county-level votes were held on July 16, with Harrison and Washington counties approving the sale of alcohol by large majorities. The first legal consumption of alcohol took place at the Broadwater Beach Hotel in Biloxi on July 27.)		
North Carolina	January 1, 1909	1935	1937	November 21, 1978	
Tennessee	July 1, 1909	1939			
Alabama	July 1, 1915	1936			
Ohio	May 27, 1919	1933			
Oregon	January 1, 1916	1933			
West Virginia	July 1, 1914	1934			
Washington	January 1, 1916	1934			
Montana	December 31, 1918	1934			
Nebraska	May 1, 1917	1934			
Nevada	December 16, 1918	1933			
New Hampshire	May 1, 1918	1934			
New Mexico	October 1, 1918	1933			
Indiana	April 2, 1918	1933			
Michigan	April 30, 1918	1933			
Florida	January 1, 1919	1934			
Kentucky	November 1919	1934			
Texas	June 26, 1918	September 15, 1933	1935	April 21, 1971	
Virginia	November 1, 1916	1934			
Utah	November 5, 1918	1934			
South Carolina	December 31, 1915	1934			
Idaho	January 1, 1916	1934			
Colorado	January 1, 1916	1933			
Arkansas	January 1, 1916	1933			
Arizona	January 1, 1915	1933			
Wyoming	June 30, 1919	1934			
Alaska	January 1, 1918	April 7, 1933	May 1, 1934	July 1, 1939	

== See also ==
- Dry county
- Alcoholic beverage control state
- List of alcohol laws of the United States by state
- Alcohol prohibition in India
