= Republican Citizens Committee Against National Prohibition =

The Republican Citizens Committee Against National Prohibition was established shortly before the 1932 Republican National Convention to pressure the party to support the repeal of prohibition. Key members included Joseph H. Choate, Jr., Henry Bourne Joy, Thomas W. Phillips, Raymond Pitcairn, and Lammot du Pont.
