= William H. Stayton =

American activist, lawyer, military officer

William Henry Stayton (28 March 1861 – 13 July 1942) was an attorney, United States Naval Academy graduate, and officer in both the US Navy and the US Marine Corps, who founded the Association Against the Prohibition Amendment in 1918 and served as chairman of its board of directors.

Stayton and the Association played an important role in bringing about the repeal of prohibition in the U.S. (1933).

Stayton authored the Naval Militiaman's Handbook (1895).
