= Mark H. Moore =

Professor of management at Harvard

Mark H. Moore is the Hauser Professor for Nonprofit Organizations and Faculty Chair of the Hauser Center for Nonprofit Organizations at the John F. Kennedy School of Government at Harvard University.

== Education ==
Mark H. Moore earned a B.A. at Yale University (summa cum laude) with exceptional distinction in political science and economics as well as a M.P.P. and Ph.D. from the Kennedy School of Government, Harvard University.

== Professional life ==
From 1974 to 2004, Moore was the Guggenheim Professor of Program Criminal Justice Policy and Management at the Kennedy School of Government. In 2004, he became the Hauser Professor for Nonprofit Organizations, a position he still holds. He is also the Founding Chairman of the School's Committee on Executive Programs, has served as chair for over a decade.

In the late 1990s and the 2000s, he has been one of the primary critics of the New Public Management movement dominating public administration development in the 1980s and early 1990s and can be considered as one of the main contributors to the shift to public value management.

He wrote the book Creating Public Value: Strategic Management in Government (Harvard University Press, 1995, ISBN 9780674175587) on strategic management.

== Research interests ==
- Public management and leadership
- Civil society and community mobilization
- Criminal justice policy and management
