= Charles H. Sabin =

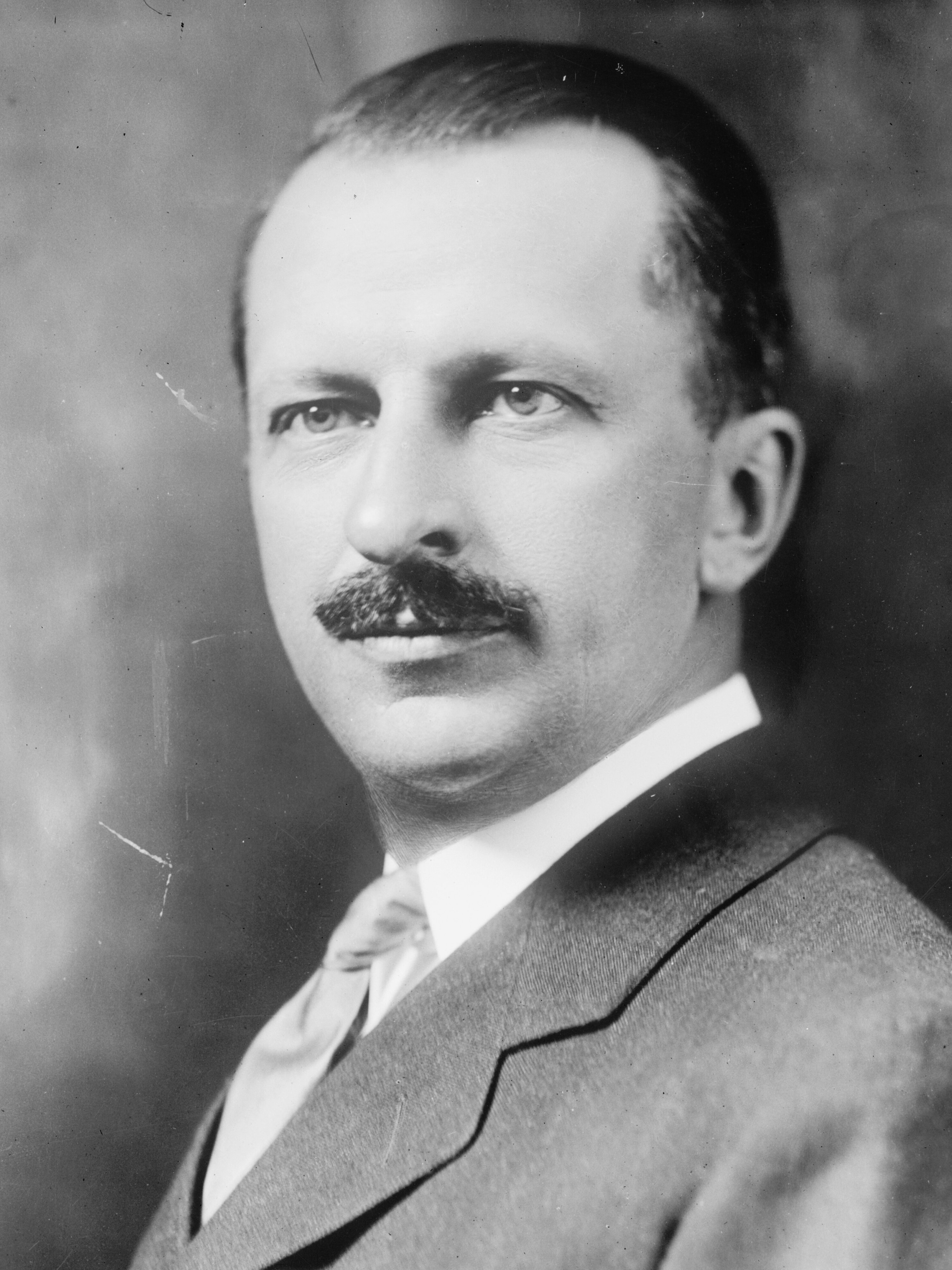

President of Guaranty Trust Company of New York
- In office 1915–1921
- Preceded by: Alexander J. Hemphill
- Succeeded by: William C. Potter

Personal details
- Born: August 24, 1868 Williamstown, Massachusetts
- Died: October 11, 1933 (aged 65) Southampton, New York
- Spouse(s): Mabel Whitney (m. 1897; div. 1916) Pauline Morton Smith (m. 1916; died 1933)
- Children: Charles H. Sabin Jr.

Charles Hamilton Sabin (August 24, 1868 – October 11, 1933) was an American banker who served as president of the Guaranty Trust Company of New York.

== Early life ==
Sabin was born in Williamstown, Massachusetts on August 24, 1868. He was the son of Thomas Sabin and Cordelia Harriett (née Eldridge) Sabin (a daughter of Reuben Eldridge). He had a sister, Caroline W. Sabin of Saratoga Springs, New York.

He was educated at the Greylock Institute in Williamstown, graduating in 1885. Reportedly, family finances did not allow for college, so he went to work as a flour salesman in nearby Albany, New York. He later received an honorary degree from Williams College in 1915.

== Career ==
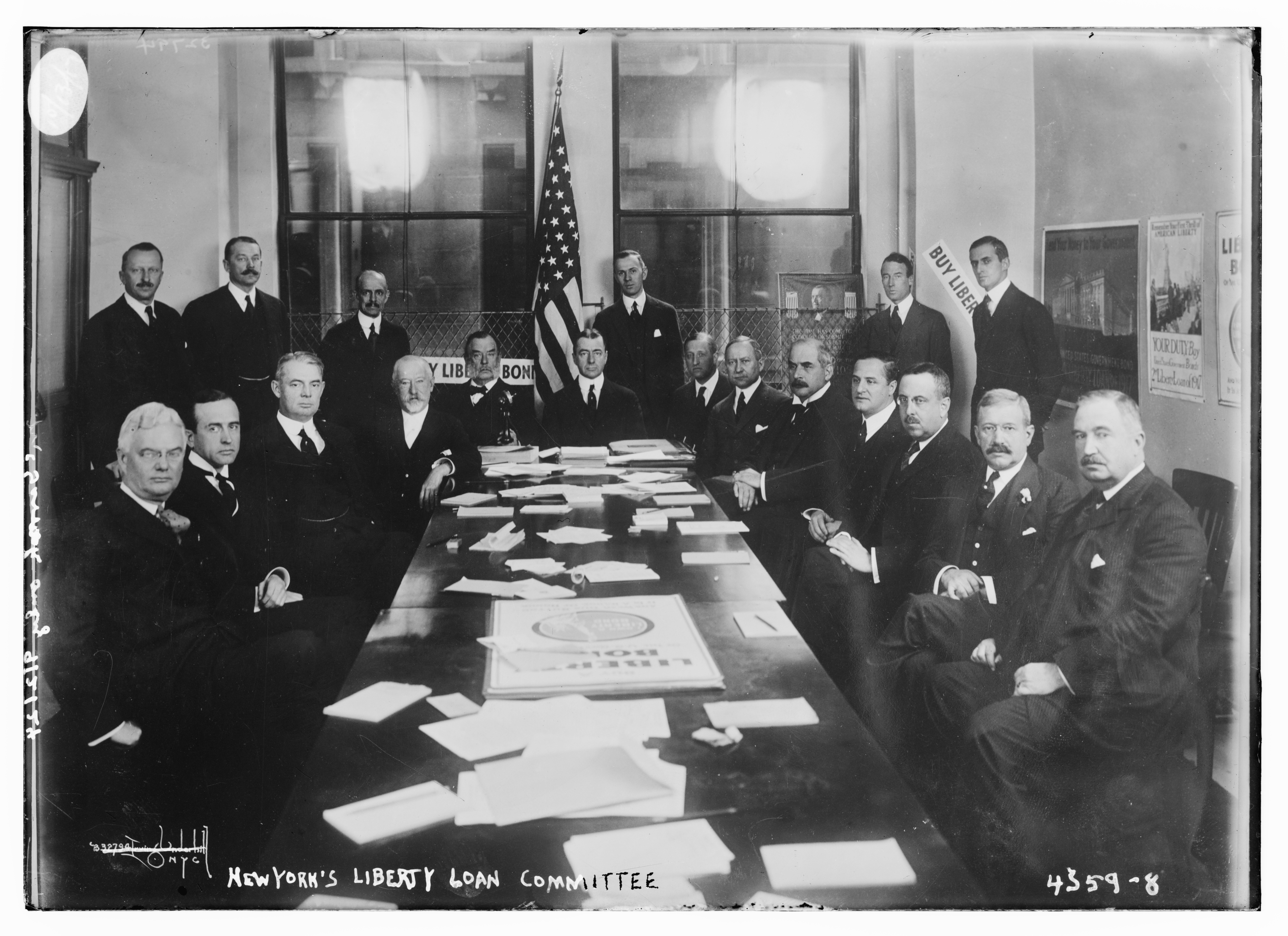
New York's Liberty loan committee, Sabin is seen standing, first on the left

In 1887, Sabin began his career in banking at the National Commercial Bank of Albany. From 1891 to 1898, he worked for the Park Bank at Albany before working for the Albany City National Bank. A "run-down" bank, he turned it around and four years later it merged with the National Commercial Bank. He remained there until 1907 when he came to New York City to become vice-president of the National Copper Bank. In 1910, the National Copper Bank merged with the Mechanics National Bank to form Mechanics and Metals National Bank, serving as vice president from 1910 to 1915 when he was appointed president, and then served as chairman of the board from 1921 to 1929.

Concurrently, he joined the Guaranty Trust Company of New York as a vice president in 1910, later becoming president in 1915, succeeding Alexander J. Hemphill who became chairman of the board in place of Levi P. Morton. He became vice chairman in 1929 and, after six years as president, Sabin was elected chairman of the board in 1930, and his brother-in-law, William Chapman Potter, was elected president. He remained chairman of the board of the Guaranty Trust Company until his death in 1933.

Both Sabin and his second wife, Pauline, were ardently opposed to prohibition, and served as treasurer of the Association Against the Prohibition Amendment. Sabin was a Democrat who supported Alfred E. Smith and Franklin D. Roosevelt and led the Democratic Victory Campaign in New York in 1931. Pauline, however, was a prominent Republican.

== Personal life ==
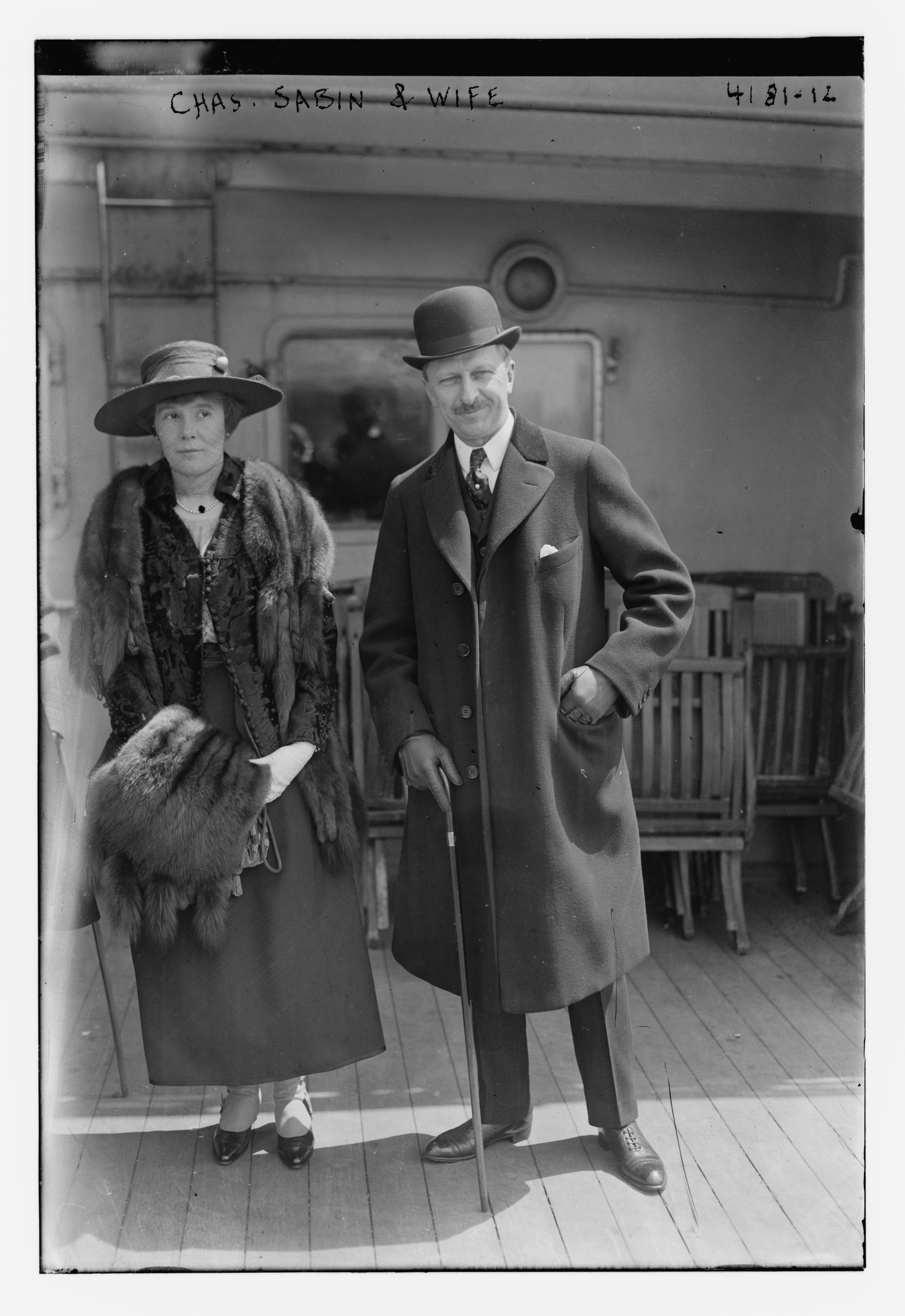
Photograph of Sabin and his second wife, Pauline, 1917

On December 29, 1897, Sabin was married to Mabel Whitney (1874–1968), a daughter of merchant William Minot Whitney, head of the dry goods firm of W. M. Whitney & Co., and Amelia (née Cook) Whitney of Albany. Before their divorce in 1916, they were the parents of son:

- Charles Hamilton Sabin Jr. (1902–1986), who married Ruth Ogden, a daughter of Henry Day Ogden of Chatham, NJ, in 1927. They divorced in 1931 and he married Dorothy (née Layman) Ransdell of Washington, D.C., a daughter of Charles A. Layman and the former wife of Dr. Robert C. Ransdell, in August 1931.

After their divorce, Mabel married stockbroker Dexter Blagden in April 1918. Mabel, a founder of the Birth Control League and member of the executive committee of the Margaret Sanger Institute, died at 93 years old at her home overlooking the Shrewsbury River in Middletown Township, New Jersey (a Georgian mansion designed by New York architect Arthur C. Jackson) in 1968.

=== Second marriage ===
On December 28, 1916, he married Pauline (née Morton) Smith. The divorced wife of James H. Smith Jr., Pauline was a daughter of Charlotte (née Goodridge) Morton and Paul Morton, the former vice president of the Santa Fe Railroad who served as Secretary of the Navy under President Theodore Roosevelt. Her sister, Caroline, was the wife of William Chapman Potter and Harry F. Guggenheim. Caroline and Pauline were nieces of Joy Morton, founder of Morton Salt, and granddaughters of Julius Sterling Morton, who had served as Secretary of Agriculture under President Grover Cleveland. In 1918, they built Bayberry Land, a 314-acre Arts and Crafts style country estate in the Shinnecock Hills of Southampton, New York. The house was designed by architects Cross & Cross and the grounds were designed by Marian Cruger Coffin. (Note: Bayberry Land was sold to The International Brotherhood of Electrical Workers, Local No. 3 in 1949 to serve as a convalescent home for electrical workers. In 2001, the IBEW sold the property to Michael C. Pascucci of Sebonac Neck Holdings, LLC, to be developed into an 18-hole golf course, today known as Sebonack Golf Club. The house was demolished in May 2004.) They were known for entertaining at their homes. They also had an apartment in New York City at One Sutton Place South, and a 1,961-acre plantation, The Oaks, in Goose Creek, South Carolina.

Sabin died in Southampton on October 11, 1933. After a service at St. George's Episcopal Church in Stuyvesant Square, he was buried at Southampton Cemetery. (Note: At his funeral, the honorary bearers were Reeve Schley, Frank L. Polk, Sheppard Homans, William Chapman Potter, John Walter Cross, Dr. J. I. Russell, Cornelius F. Kelley, D. E. Pomeroy, Charles Blair Macdonald, Henry M. Sage, Edward Shearson and Joseph R. Swan. The ushers were Charles C. Auchincloss, Courtlandt Nicoll, Eugene W. Stetson, Merrel P. Callaway, Harold Stanley and W. H. Barnum. The funeral was attended by John D. Rockefeller Jr. and Abby Aldrich Rockefeller, James W. Gerard, John J. Raskob, Thomas W. Lamont, Percy Lamont, Richard Whitney, George Whitney Jr., Cornelius N. Bliss, Mrs. Daniel Guggenheim, Mr. and Mrs. Albert H. Wiggin, Myron C. Taylor, George F. Baker, Charles E. Mitchell, Marshall Field. P. A. S. Franklin, Mrs. H. P. Davison, Louis Wiley, Henry deForest, Mr. and Mrs. F. W. Watrous, James J. Hawkins, Mrs. H. B. Claflin, William H. Chadbourne, John C. King, Herbert L. Pratt, Mr. and Mrs. G. Hermann Kinnicutt, Louis Clark, Frederick Straus, John W. Davis, Morgan J. O'Brien, Clarence Mackay and Anna Case Mackay, John Mackay.) In his will, he left $50,000 to the Boys Club of Manhattan. After his death, his widow married Dwight F. Davis in 1936. Davis was the founder of the Davis Cup international tennis competition and had previously served as the Assistant Secretary of War and Secretary of War.
