= William Chapman Potter =

American industrialist and banker

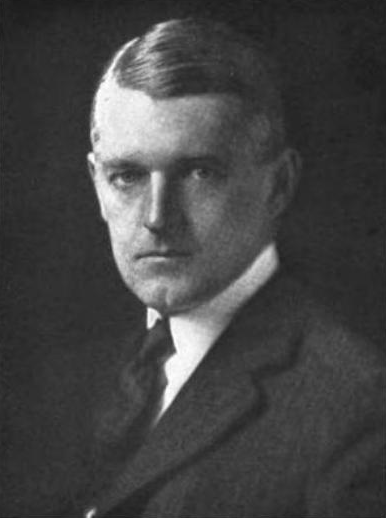

President of Guaranty Trust Company of New York
- In office 1921–1947
- Preceded by: Charles H. Sabin
- Succeeded by: William L. Kleitz

Personal details
- Born: October 16, 1874 Chicago, Illinois
- Died: January 3, 1957 (aged 82) Albany, Georgia
- Spouse(s): Caroline Morton (m. 1902; div. 1922) Rose Lee Saltonstall (m. 1923; died 1946)
- Children: 3
- Parent(s): Edwin Augustus Potter; Harriet Ann Berry
- Education: Massachusetts Institute of Technology

William Chapman Potter (October 16, 1874 - January 2, 1957) was an American industrialist and banker.

== Early life ==
Potter was born on October 16, 1874 in Chicago, Illinois. He was the son of Edwin Augustus Potter (1842–1936), and Harriet Ann (née Berry) Potter (1848–1937), who were both from Sagadahoc County, Maine. Among his siblings were Edwin Augustus Potter Jr. (who married Cora Prindeville), and Gertrude Potter (wife of William Roland Cox Jr. and William Stuart Forbes).

His paternal grandparents were William Potter and Pamelia G. Potter. His maternal grandparents were Alfred L. Berry and Mary L. (née White) Berry. Through his brother Edwin, who was a vice president at Guaranty Trust, he was a uncle of Sheila Potter, who married Lt.-Cdr. Sheldon Ellsworth Prentice (parents of Clare Ellsworth Prentice who married Cary Nicholas Potter, a grandson of Alonzo Potter and W. Kingsland Macy).

Potter was educated at the Massachusetts Institute of Technology, where he trained as a mining engineer before graduating in 1897.

== Career ==
Upon graduation, he began a career in mining, working in New Mexico, Colorado, and Montana during a period of enormous growth in the mining industry. In 1901, he became an engineer for the Atchison, Topeka and Santa Fe Railway before becoming a partner in the Chicago mining engineering firm of Dickman, Mackenzie & Potter.

In 1904, Potter became affiliated with the Guggenheim interests, where he became general manager of the Guggenheim Exploration Company of Mexico. He later served as general manager of the American Smelting and Refining Company, one of the largest companies involved in the production of refined metals, and as president of the Intercontinental Rubber Company in 1911.

By 1912, Potter transitioned into finance after he was elected a vice president of Guaranty Trust Company of New York, one of the largest banks in the United States. He resigned as an office of the bank in 1916 to become a partner at Guggenheim Brothers, while remaining a board member. He became chairman of the board in 1921, and shortly thereafter became president, succeeding his brother-in-law, Charles H. Sabin, while relinquishing the chairmanship. In 1934, he was again elected chairman of the board, which he held until 1941, when he transitioned to serve as a director. He was also chairman of the bank's executive committee from 1941 to 1946, and continued as a director until January 1967 when he became director emeritus. During his long tenure he steered Guaranty Trust through the aftermath of the World War I, the Roaring Twenties, the Great Depression, all the way through World War II.

He was a Class A director of the Federal Reserve Bank of New York from 1937 to 1940, and president of the New York Clearing House from 1944 to 1945. Throughout his career, he served as a director of the Anaconda Company, Bethlehem Steel Corporation, Atchison, Topeka and Santa Fe Railway, Electric Bond and Share Company, Columbia Gas and Electric Corporation, and the Interborough Rapid Transit Company. He served as board chairman of the Kennecott Copper Corporation, and was a vice president of the Braden Copper Company.

Potter was a founding trustee of the American Bankers Association and served on the board of governors of the Bankers Club of the United States. He served as the longtime treasurer and trustee of the Juilliard Music Foundation, and was also a member of the American Institute of Mining and Metallurgical Engineers.

=== Military career ===
During World War I, he took leave from his business career to become chief of the equipment division of the U.S. Army Signal Corps, overseeing the task of providing communications equipment to American forces in the field. For his work he received the U.S. Army Distinguished Service Medal, as well as decorations from Belgium and Italy, recognizing his contribution to the Allied effort.

== Personal life ==
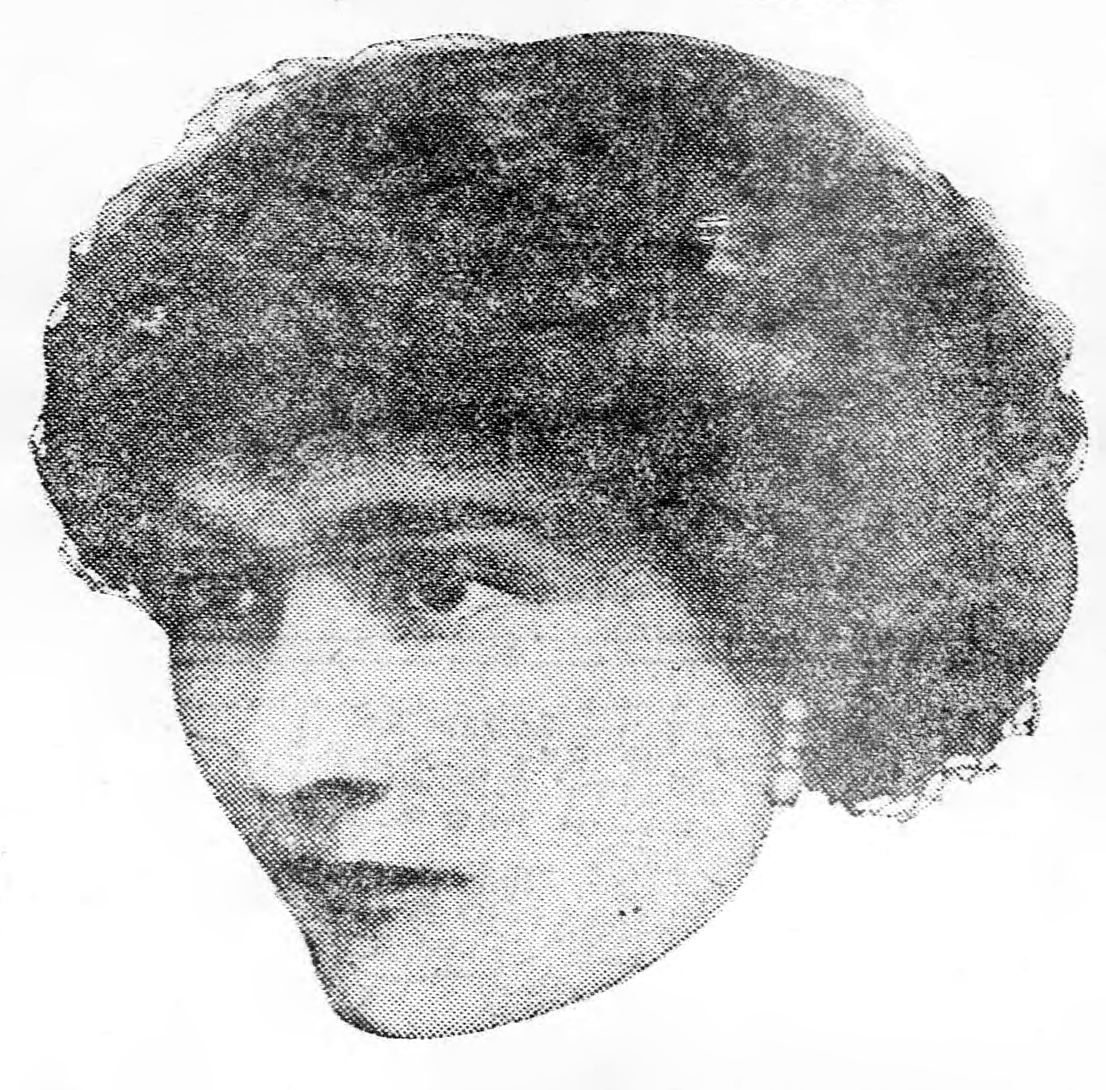
Photograph of his first wife, Caroline, 1922.

In 1902 in Chicago, Potter was married to Caroline Morton (1882–1952), the eldest daughter of Paul Morton, the U.S. Secretary of the Navy under President Theodore Roosevelt, and Charlotte "Lottie" (née Goodrich) Morton. Caroline's sister, Pauline Joy Morton, was the wife of James H. Smith Jr., Charles H. Sabin, and Dwight F. Davis. Her uncles, Joy Morton and Mark Morton, were the founders of Morton Salt. In 1914, they rented 177 East 71st Street from Douglas L. Elliman. In 1917, they purchased 6 East 77th Street from Edmund Coffin (which he acquired from Charles Henry Marshall's widow). Before they divorced in Paris in October 1922, they were the parents of:

- Jean Morton Potter (1903–1957), who married architect and painter Frederic August Soldwedel in 1924. They divorced and she married Edmund Coffin Stout Jr. in 1934. He died in 1943 and she married Horace Ransom Bigelow Allen, who had previously been engaged to Edith Ewing Bouvier and married to Kiki Preston, in 1947. He remarried before his death in 1961.
- Charlotte Morton Potter (1905–1972), who married golfer Reginald M. Lewis in 1926. They divorced in 1930, and she married stockbroker Roy Franklin Atwood, a son of Herbert Franklin Atwood, in 1934. They divorced and she married Robert Jennings. They divorced and she married Thomas Wynward Sabine Pasley, a son of Thomas Hamilton Sabine Pasley (a grandson of Sir Thomas Sabine Pasley, 2nd Baronet), in 1957.
- Pauline Morton Potter (1917–1917), who died in infancy.

After their divorce, Caroline married Harry F. Guggenheim in February 1923. After the wedding, his father gave them 90 acres in Long Island where they had architects Frederick J. Sterner along with Polhemus & Coffin build Falaise "in the style of a 13th-century Norman manor house". She sold 6 East 77th Street to George Arents in 1925. They had a daughter, Diane Guggenheim. After being separate for two years, they divorced in July 1939, and she married Williams before her death in 1952.

=== Second marriage ===
Potter remarried, on March 10, 1923, to Rose Lee Saltonstall (1892–1946), a daughter of Philip Leverett Saltonstall (a son of Leverett Saltonstall II) and Frances Anne Fitch (née Sherwood) Saltonstall (a daughter of Thomas Dubois Sherwood). After Rose's father died in 1919, her mother remarried to Dr. Joel E. Goldthwait in 1936. Rose's brother, Philip Leverett Saltonstall Jr., married actress Maxine Jennings, and her sister, Katherine Leverett Saltonstall, married Philip B. Weld. Another sister, Frances Sherwood Saltonstall, married George von Lengerke Meyer Jr. (son of George von Lengerke Meyer) and Dr. Eugene Hillhouse Pool.

In addition to his New York City residence, Potter had a residences on the North Shore of Long Island, and a plantation in Georgia known as "Blue Springs Plantation". Potter first assembled the plantation in the 1920s before he commissioned Hentz, Adler & Shutze of Atlanta to design the main house in 1930. After his death, Edward Vason Jones of Albany was hired to add Classical Revival dependencies.

His wife died at 66 East 79th Street, their 16-room duplex apartment in Manhattan, aged 54, on November 29, 1946. Potter died on January 2, 1957 at his plantation in Albany, Georgia. He was buried at Locust Valley Cemetery in Locust Valley, New York.

=== Descendants ===
Through his daughter Jean, he was a grandfather of Pamela Soldwedel (1926–2015), who married Carlton T. Clark Jr. in 1948. She later married banker Richard D. Barrett.
