= Alexander J. Hemphill =

President of Guaranty Trust Company of New York
- In office 1909–1915
- Preceded by: John W. Castles
- Succeeded by: Charles H. Sabin

Personal details
- Born: August 23, 1856 Philadelphia, Pennsylvania
- Died: December 29, 1920 (aged 64) New York City, New York
- Spouse: Jeannette Cadmus (m. 1880; died 1920)
- Parent(s): William Kerr Hemphill; Sarah Jane McCune
- Education: Central High School

Alexander Julian Hemphill (August 23, 1856 - December 29, 1920) was an American railroad executive and banker.

== Early life ==
Hemphill was born in Philadelphia, Pennsylvania on August 23, 1856. He was the son of William Kerr Hemphill (1821–1874) and Sarah Jane (née McCune) Hemphill (1826–1896). His maternal grandparents were manufacturer Clement McCune and Rachel (née Reed) McCune.

He attended the public schools in Philadelphia, graduating from Central High School in 1875. While he intended to attend college, having studied with private tutors for that purpose, he changed his mind and entered the accounting department of the Pennsylvania Railroad Company.

== Career ==
He spent eight years with the Pennsylvania Railroad Company before leaving in 1883 to become the youngest railroad Secretary in the United States, with the Norfolk and Western Railway. He was with Norfolk and Western until 1905, when he retired from the railroad business and went into banking.

Hemphill was affiliated with the Guaranty Trust Company of New York for fifteen years, including service as vice president, president on December 8, 1909, and chairman of the board of directors. (Note: Hemphill, as senior vice president, had been acting head of Guaranty Trust since the resignation of John Wesley Castles, the previous year.) As he was chairman at the time of his death, William Chapman Potter was selected as successor chairman.

In addition to the board of Guaranty Trust, he served on the boards of the American Surety Company of New York, Fidelity and Casualty Company, Hudson & Manhattan Railroad Company, Interborough Consolidated Corporation, Locomobile Company, Missouri Pacific Railroad, Richmond Light and Railroad, Southern Cotton Oil Company, Texas & Pacific Railway, United Gas and Electric, and the Virginia-Carolina Chemical Corporation.

=== Philanthropy ===
As early as 1914, Hemphill took a leading part in the work of war relief, and until the end he was active on behalf of many relief organizations. He was Treasurer of the Commission for Relief in Belgium in 1914 (its chairman was future President Herbert Hoover), Treasurer of the Food for France Fund, the Fatherless Children of France Fund, the Inter-Racial Council, National Security League and the National Americanization Committee (led by Frances Kellor). The French Government made him a Chevalier of the Legion of Honor, and Belgium gave him the rank of Commander of the Order of the Crown and the Grand Cross of the Order of Leopold.

He was also President of the Automobile Club of America and a member of the Century Association, Metropolitan Club, Rittenhouse Club of Philadelphia, Union League Club, Bankers.

== Personal life ==
On April 29, 1880 in Pennsylvania, Hemphill was married to Jeannette "Nettie" Cadmus (1856–1935) of Philadelphia. Together, they were the parents of the following, surviving, children:

- Jeannette Hemphill (1883–1971), who married Charles Bolte of Pelham Heights, New York, in 1912.
- Albert Weimer Hemphill (1885–1955), a civil engineer with Hemphill & Wells; he married Margaret Morgan Hovey, daughter of Franklin H. Hovey, in 1910.
- Clifford Hemphill (1889–1966), an investment banker with Hemphill, Noyes & Co.; he married Mary Abbie Tripp, a daughter of Guy Eastman Tripp.
- Meredith Hemphill (1902–1969), who married Katherine Earle Dilworth, a daughter of Thomas Gordon Dilworth, in 1928.

Hemphill died at his home, 13 East 69th Street, on December 29, 1920. After a service at All Souls Church in Manhattan, he was buried at the Old Tennent Churchyard in Manalapan, New Jersey. (Note: As his funeral, the honorary pallbearers were George F. Baker, Charles H. Sabin, Herbert Hoover, Samuel Heilner, Charles H. Sanford, General Guy Eastman Tripp, A. L. Gubelman, Finley Johnson Shepard, Samuel Rea, Thomas Fortune Ryan, T. DeWitt Cuyler, Sidney Z. Mitchell, Albert H. Harris, Charles A. Peabody, Leonor F. Loree, Edward Shearson and Charles M. Schwab.) In appreciation of Hemphill's aid in the relief of Belgium, Baron Emile de Cartier de Marchienne, the Belgian Ambassador to the United States, attended the funeral at the special request of King Albert. In his will, which was only eighty-four words long, he left his entire estate to his widow, Jeannette. In 1922, his estate was valued at $1,462,731 (equivalent to $28,135,000 in 2025).

=== Descendants ===
Through his son Meredith, he was a grandfather of Shirley Hemphill, who married Harlan Jessup; Jean Hemphill, who married Yale Law School graduate George Willard Pugh in 1952; and Meredith Hemphill Jr., an attorney with Bethlehem Steel.
