= David Kohn (disambiguation) =

David Kohn (1838–1915) was a Russian archaeologist and Hebrew writer.

David Kohn may also refer to:

- Dave Kohn (fl. 1917–1922), American songwriter
- David Kohn (architect) (born 1972), British architect
