= Arbor Lodge State Historical Park and Arboretum =

Landmark in Nebraska City, Nebraska, US

Arbor Lodge State Historical Park
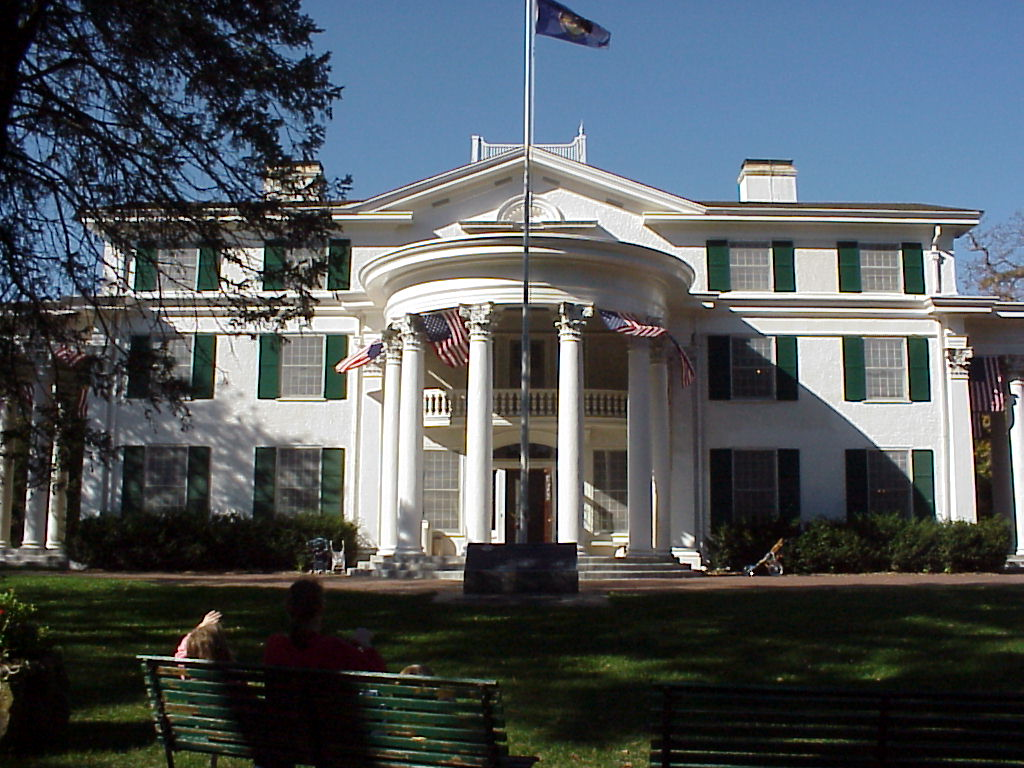
- Front entrance of Arbor Lodge

- Location within Nebraska
- Location: Nebraska City, Nebraska, United States
- Coordinates: 40°40′53″N 95°52′49″W
- Area: 73.85 acres (29.89 ha)
- Elevation: 1,066 ft (325 m)
- Established: 1923
- Administrator: Arbor Day Foundation
- Website: Smith Falls State Park
- Arbor Lodge
- U.S. National Register of Historic Places
- U.S. National Historic Landmark
- Location: 2600 Arbor Ave., Nebraska City, Nebraska
- Area: 72 acres (29 ha)
- Built: 1855
- Architect: House: Jarvis Hunt; Grounds: Frederick Law Olmsted
- Architectural style: Colonial Revival
- NRHP reference No.: 69000135

Significant dates
- Added to NRHP: April 16, 1969
- Designated NHL: May 15, 1975

Arbor Lodge State Historical Park and Arboretum is a mansion and arboretum at 2600 Arbor Avenue, Nebraska City, Nebraska, United States. The park is a National Historic Landmark, listed on the National Register of Historic Places since 1969.

== History ==
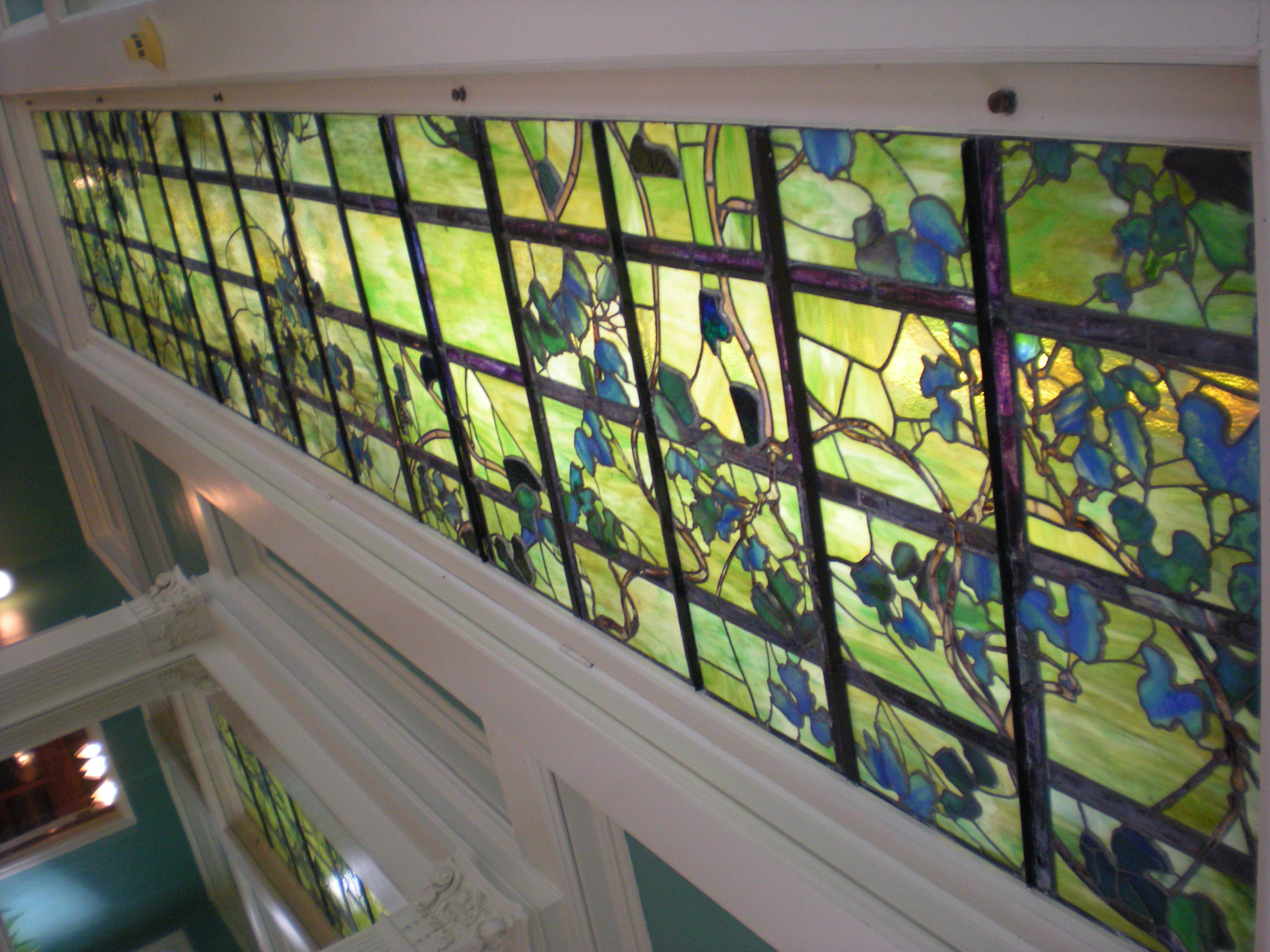
The Tiffany skylight in the sun parlor

The 52-room neo-colonial house began in 1855 for J. Sterling Morton, originator of Arbor Day and Secretary of Agriculture in the 1890s under President Grover Cleveland. The house was originally a modest 4-room frame structure on 160 acres (65 ha). It was extended several times, most recently in 1903, and in later years served as the summer home for his son Joy Morton, founder of Morton Salt Company. The mansion features Victorian and Empire furnishings, many of which were owned by the Mortons. Its sun parlor contains a fine Tiffany skylight with grape trellis design.

Trees were a central interest of J. Sterling Morton. He imported trees from all over the country in order to test their suitability to create windbreaks and otherwise break up the monotony of the great plains. The house is surrounded by 270 varieties of trees and shrubs, including gardens, apple orchards, and acres of oaks, maples, chestnuts, and pines, including at least 10 state-champion trees. Specimen trees are typically labeled with engraved bronze plates. Over the years, many of Arbor Lodge's apple orchards were demolished, but in the 1990s their restoration began with plantings of winesaps, golden delicious, red delicious, jonathans, and jonadels.

== Activities and amenities ==
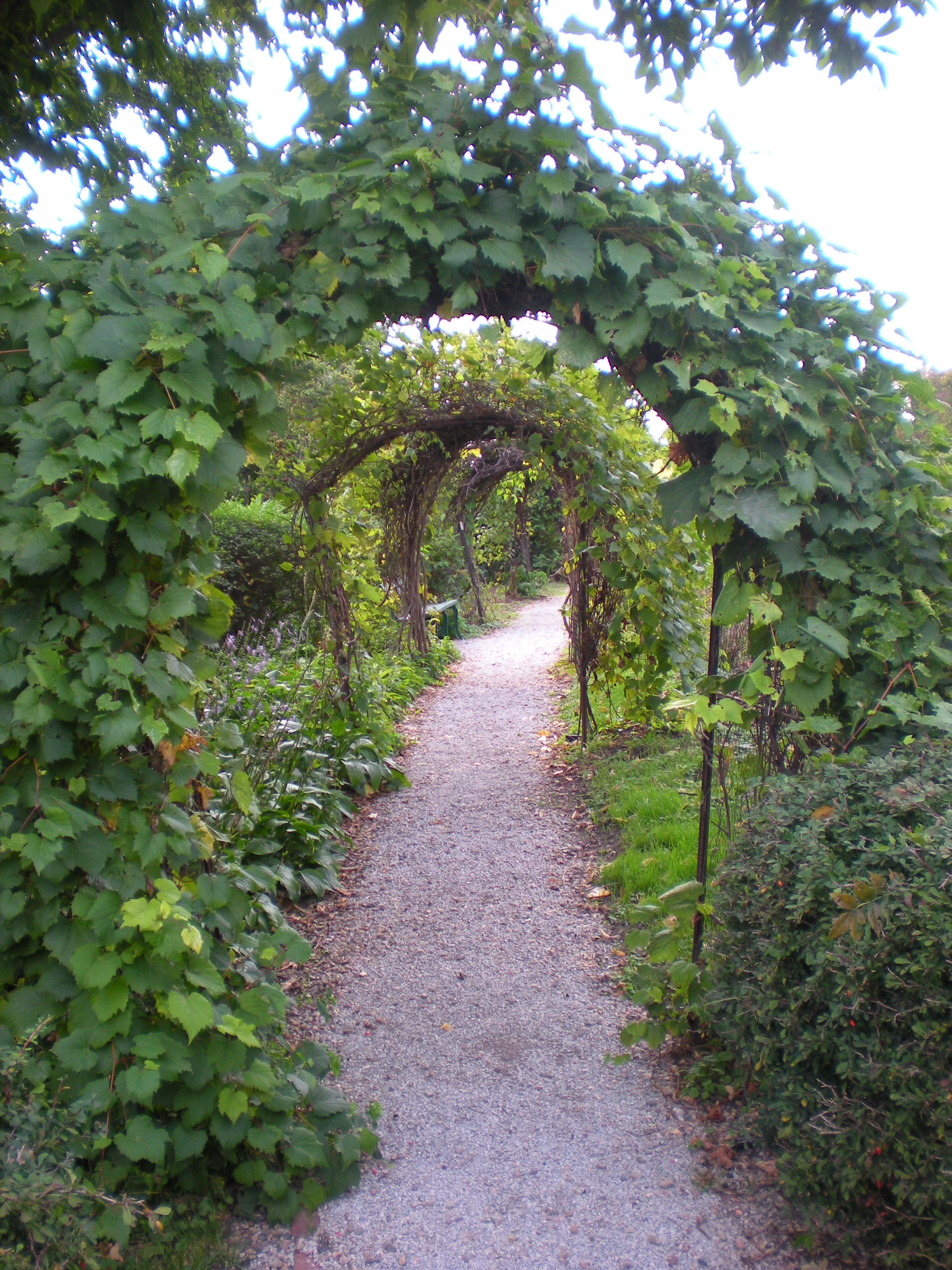
Pathway in the rose garden on the south side of the mansion

The mansion functions as a museum and contains many items related to the early history of Nebraska, Otoe County, and Nebraska City. The park includes an arboretum, Italian terraced garden, log cabin, carriage house with early carriages, walking trails, and 200 varieties of lilacs. Since 2014, the state park has been managed by the Arbor Day Foundation.

== See also ==
- List of botanical gardens in the United States
- National Register of Historic Places listings in Otoe County, Nebraska
- List of National Historic Landmarks in Nebraska
