= The Crusaders (repeal of alcohol prohibition) =

Defunct organisation in the United States

The Crusaders was an organization founded to promote the repeal of prohibition in the United States. The executive board consisted of fifty members, including Alfred Sloan Jr., Sewell Avery, Cleveland Dodge, and Wallage Alexander. They wanted the government to create stronger laws regarding drunkenness.

== Background ==
The organization was founded in May 1929 as a local Cleveland group under the leadership of Fred G. Clark. They were motivated to start this anti-prohibition campaign because of the St. Valentine's Day Massacre in Chicago, an outbreak of violence between rival bootleggers. In the words of the founder, Fred G. Clark, their goal was "to get the facts about prohibition, and to arouse the nation to demand repeal of the Eighteenth Amendment" said Clark. Clark would also say that he was personally motivated to organize the Crusaders due to the growing wealth of gangsters and the decline of societal law and order in the United States.

=== Prohibition ===
The Crusaders described themselves as "temperance men" who would eliminate alcohol abuse without the problems caused by Prohibition. Because of this, they were criticized by prohibitionists as "Cork-screw aiders." They realized the effects alcohol had on society but instead of altogether prohibiting alcohol, the crusaders advocated temperance. They wanted alcohol to be legal along with everyone being educated about the consequences of alcohol which encouraged temperance and moderation.

==== Why was prohibition introduced? ====
National prohibition of alcohol (1920–1933) was introduced with the hopes of reducing crime and corruption, solving social problems among classes, reducing the tax burden created by prisons and poorhouses, and improving health and hygiene in America. Prohibition was also introduced in order to boost supplies of important grains like Barley. Advocates of prohibition believed that alcohol was a cause for many health problems. Alcohol damages the liver, which can lead to people needing liver transplants or dying. Moral health was also called into question. People knew that one could not control their behaviour when they were drunk. Religion, particularly Christianity, was another moral factor that led to prohibition. Many of the organizations that were pushing for prohibition were directly linked to various Christian denominations. This is true, but only if they drink alcohol in large amounts. Lastly, prohibition was introduced because it already existed in a number of states. This made it a lot easier to ban alcohol across the country as some people were already used to not drinking anyway.

==== Why did prohibition fail? ====
Prohibition was repealed in 1933 because of many reasons. One reason was that there was not enough prohibition workers to cover all of the United States and because of this, none were paid very well making most of them become corrupt and easily bribable. Another reason was the rise of organized crime centering around the lucrative smuggling and selling of alcohol. Not many people paid attention to prohibition due to this poor enforcement.

==== Consequences of Prohibition ====
There were many consequences of prohibition which led Clark to start The Crusaders. Organized crime flourished, everyday people became criminals (transporting, selling, and consuming alcohol became illegal yet everybody was still doing it and drug consumption rose. The most significant consequence of prohibition was when people started to make homemade alcohol. This was very unsafe because they were using homemade stills and stilling everything organic including couches. This was very poisonous due to the methanol produced when wood is fermented. As more homemade stills became prominent, the government started to add more poison to products such as weed killers (which was what many people were stilling to make beer). They thought this would encourage people to stop stilling their own liquor but instead it killed more people. The government officials turned a blind eye even when 33 people died over a period of just three days in Manhattan due to consuming homemade alcoholic drinks that contained lethal amounts of methanol.

=== Predecessors ===
The predecessor to the Crusaders was an organization known as the Association Against the Prohibition Amendment, or AAPA. This national organization formed before the 1920s in an effort to bring “prosperity” back to the United States and “save the constitution” by fighting for the repeal of alcohol prohibition. The Association Against the Prohibition Amendment opposed alcohol prohibition because of its negative aspects, such as bootlegging, drunkenness, and crime. The AAPA thought these national problems could only be solved by striking the 18th Amendment from the constitution, and it blamed alcohol prohibition for the country's declining economic state. In order to spread their ideas, the AAPA was very active in nationwide propaganda and had the backing of breweries, wealthy individuals, and various politicians who supported repealing the 18th Amendment. The organization controlled the policies of a large number of American periodicals, and it gave money to politicians and office holders who vowed to spread anti-prohibition propaganda to the people of the United States.

One account of the organization by a proponent of prohibition said its membership was made up of the sons of members of the Association Against the Prohibition Amendment. The Crusaders, much like the AAPA, was a temperance-driven group. The group received large-scale publicity in the United States, and it was able to exert a powerful influence through appearances in political conventions, city councils, state legislatures, and National Congress. The Crusaders believed that all people would avoid drunkenness through a proper education, and the organization advocated for legal alcohol with an intensive educational component for all Americans. One author notes that the organization's name was a clear expression of the country's changing mindset of alcohol righteousness from dry to wet.

The Crusaders along with AAPA, Voluntary Committee of Lawyers, The American Hotel Organization, and the WONPR formed the United Repeal Council. The goal of the United Repeal Council was to integrate repeal into their respective presidential election campaigns. They did this by lobbying at both the national Republican and Democratic Conventions in 1932.

Another account of the Crusaders notes that the Women's Organization for National Prohibition Reform, or WONPR, was composed of the wives of the members of the Crusaders. Both organizations held national power and had strong ties in Michigan. Women were not allowed in the Crusaders, but the WONPR and the Crusaders worked together to elect officials who declared themselves in favor of repealing the 18th Amendment, commonly referred to as “wet” republicans.

After the Eighteenth Amendment was repealed, The Crusaders turned to other governmental issues that inhibited proper function of the Federal Government.

== Main goals ==
The three major goals of The Crusaders were to 1) repeal Prohibition enforcement legislation by securing a liberal majority in both houses of Congress, 2) repeal the Eighteenth Amendment, and 3) promote temperance and moderation through alcohol education. They did reach most of these goals when twenty first amendment was put into place which repeals the eighteenth amendment forbidding "the manufacture, sale, or transportation of intoxicating liquors".

=== Actions ===
The Crusaders used similar tactics as the Women's Christian Temperance Union and the Ohio Anti-Saloon League, however the Crusader's goals were much more moderate than the previous groups. Women in these organizations marched through the town, stopping at every saloon and praying for the souls of the barkeepers and their patrons. The women also demanded that the owners sign a pledge to no longer sell alcohol. The Crusaders worked very closely with the Women's Organization for National Prohibition Reform (WONPR) but The Crusaders were made up of only men mostly under the age of 30. The Crusaders main difference from other temperance organizations was that they wanted drinking moderation through education and through the state government, instead of having the federal government outright ban alcohol.

=== Politics ===
While the Crusaders did work on the national political level, they wanted to focus most of their efforts working on the lower political level across the nation. At the start of 1930, the organization decided to organize young men nationwide. They eventually claimed membership of one million, though the claim is dubious. By January 1930, the Crusaders, drawn mainly from the ranks of the Republican Party, had acquired around 4,000 members in Cleveland, and the group decided to try to expand nationally as an organization dedicated to repealing the 18th Amendment. A goal of the Crusaders was to recruit upwards of ten million numbers, but this goal was never achieved. The organization had serious financial problems by the fall of 1931 and was never significant nationally. In Michigan, it drew its membership largely from the ranks of young, male Republicans and worked to elect "wet" Republicans to offices at all levels of government.

=== Propaganda ===
The Crusaders published a magazine called The Hot Potato, the name of which was meant to describe how prohibition was a political issue that politicians could not handle. The organization endorsed no candidate in the presidential election of 1932.

The Crusaders also issued an anti-prohibition token. This served as both a "good luck" token of the general sort, as well as a political piece in the crusade to repeal the Eighteenth Amendment. The notation of "5 Cents" is likely just to refer to the traditional "5 Cent Beer" and not to serve as a merchant token, as it carries no specific merchant advertisement.

The Crusaders printed their cause on billboards, cars, posters, magazines, and anywhere else that it could be seen. Most of their propaganda consisted of comic book-like advertisements or simply "Repeal the 18th Amendment".

== See also ==
- Association Against the Prohibition Amendment
