= Ariane (apple) =

Apple cultivar

Malus pumila
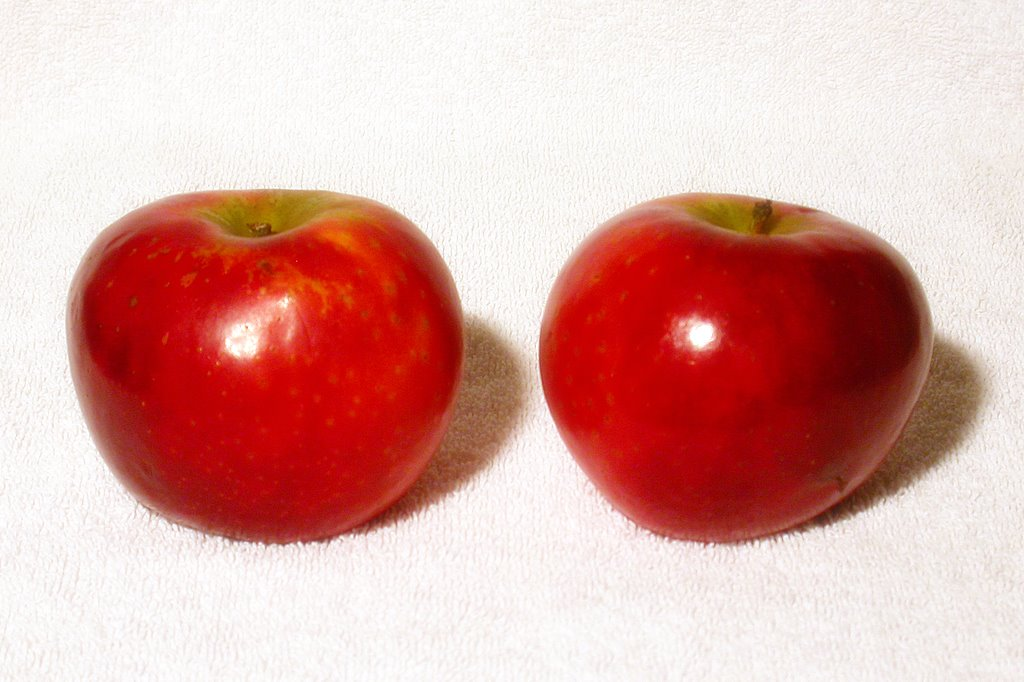
- Genus: Malus
- Species: Malus pumila
- Hybrid parentage: (Florina x Prima) x Golden Delicious
- Cultivar: Ariane
- Origin: (France) Angers

Ariane is a modern cultivar of domesticated apple that was recently developed in France for scab resistance.

Ariane is mainly served as a dessert apple because of its mild pleasant flavour. The skin has an attractive combination of yellow and red colours. It was developed by Institut national de la recherche agronomique (INRA) by crossing a hybrid of Florina and Prima with pollen from Golden Delicious.

Besides good resistance to scab, it does quite well with other apple diseases. Fruit keeps fresh three months or more. Fruit is ripening in late summer, and is delicious even if refrigerated for winter eating.
