= The Ocean Must Be Free =

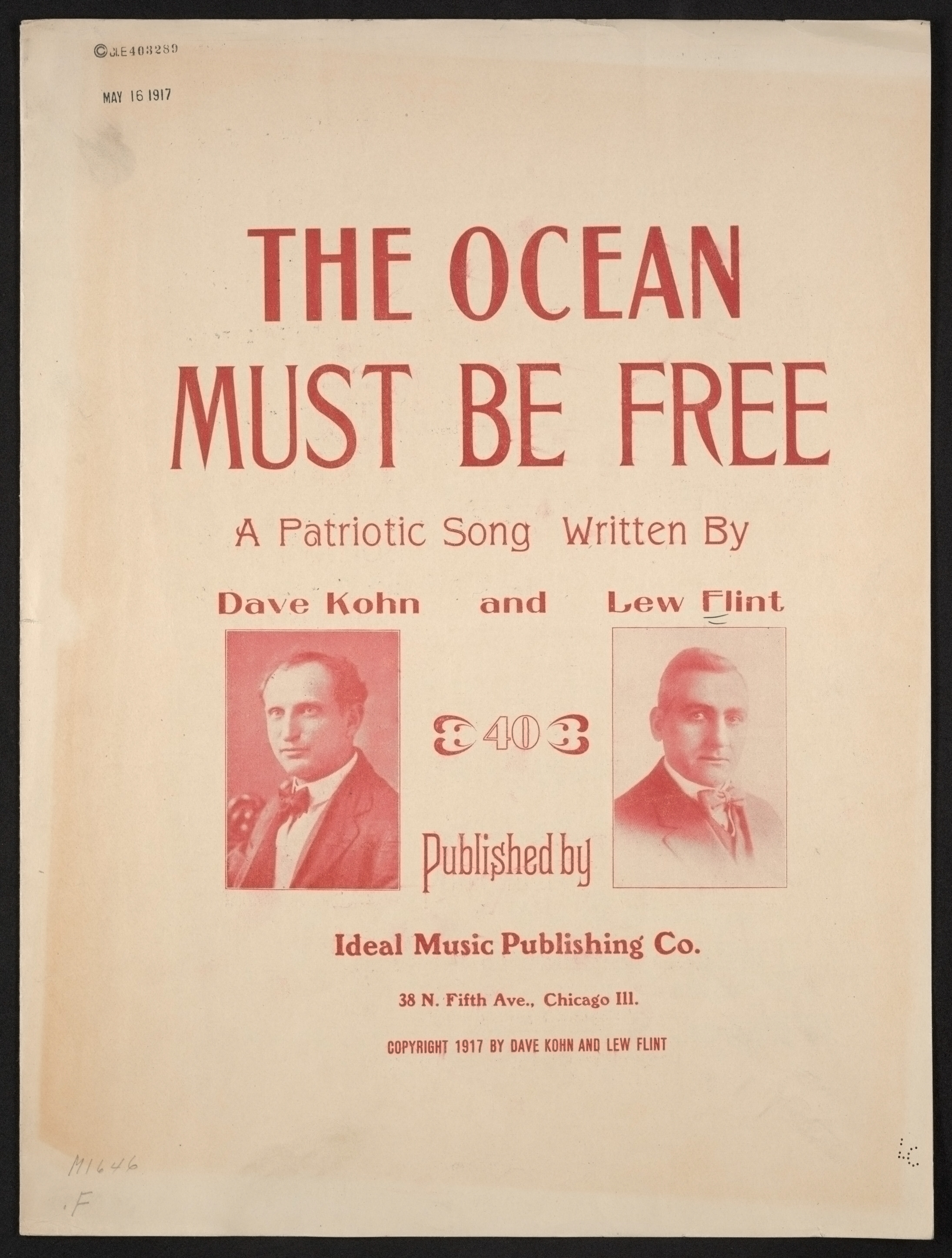
- "The Ocean Must Be Free" Sheet music cover

Song
- Published: 1917
- Label: Ideal Music Publishing Company
- Songwriter(s): Dave Kohn & Lew Flint

"The Ocean Must Be Free" is a World War I era song co-written by Dave Kohn & Lew Flint in 1917. The song was published with the caption "Dedicated to the United States Army and Navy to encourage enlistment," on the cover. The first line of the chorus is: "Boys, put on your uniforms."

== Reception ==
"The Ocean Must Be Free" was reviewed by several news and music publications at the time of its release. Billboard said "The Ocean Must be Free is an exceptionally good title for a song at the present time and the words and music are as good as the title." The Music News reported the song as "a very attractive new song which has one of the best Patriotic texts yet noted."
