= Paul Morton (politician) =

American politician (1857–1911)

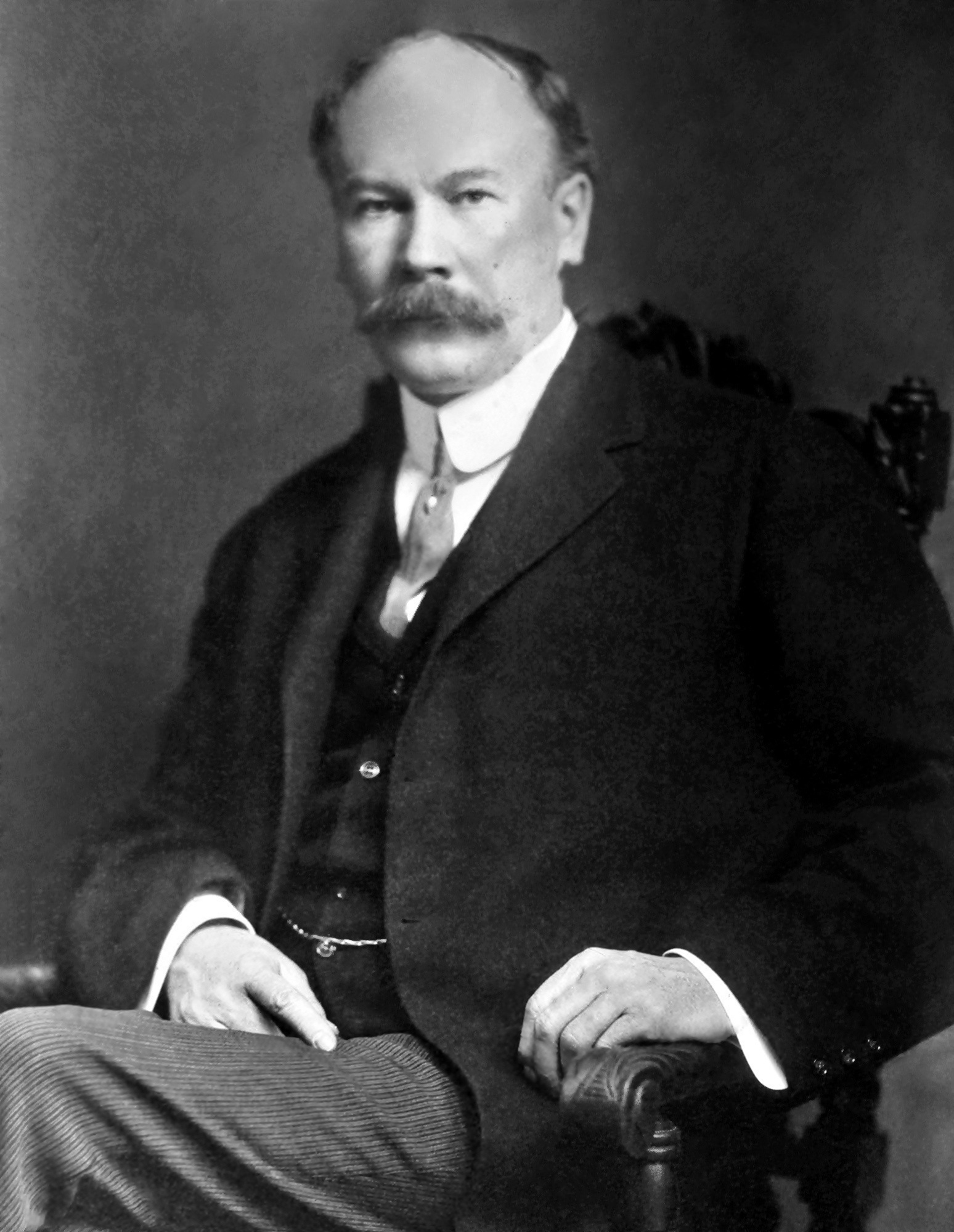
- Morton, c. 1909

36th United States Secretary of the Navy
- In office July 1, 1904 – June 30, 1905
- President: Theodore Roosevelt
- Preceded by: William Moody
- Succeeded by: Charles Bonaparte

Personal details
- Born: May 22, 1857 Detroit, Michigan, U.S.
- Died: January 19, 1911 (aged 53) New York City, New York, U.S.
- Party: Republican
- Spouse: Charlotte Goodrich (m. 1880; died 1911)
- Children: Caroline Williams; Pauline Davis
- Parent: Julius Sterling Morton (father)

Paul Morton (May 22, 1857 – January 19, 1911) was a U.S. businessman, and served as the 36th Secretary of the Navy under Theodore Roosevelt.

== Early life ==
Morton was born in Detroit, Michigan on May 22, 1857 and grew up in Nebraska City, Nebraska. A son of J. Sterling Morton, former Acting Governor of Nebraska, founder of Arbor Day, and Secretary of Agriculture under President Grover Cleveland. Among his siblings were Mark Morton, and Joy Morton, founder of Morton Salt.

== Career ==
Though his father was a "Bourbon" (i.e. conservative) Democrat, Paul Morton was a Progressive Republican. This shift of party by father/son cabinet secretaries is paralleled by that of Henry Cantwell Wallace, who served as a Progressive Republican Secretary of Agriculture under Harding and Coolidge, and his son Henry A. Wallace who served in the same office as a Democrat under Franklin D. Roosevelt.

He served as the U.S. Secretary of the Navy between 1904 and 1905. Previous to this, he had been vice president of the Santa Fe Railroad. When it came to light that the Santa Fe had given illegal rebates under Morton, he was forced out of the cabinet to avoid scandal, though Roosevelt maintained that Morton himself was unaware of the improprieties. After leaving government service, Morton was President of Equitable Life Assurance Society.

George Burroughs Torrey painted a portrait of him.

== Personal life ==
In 1880, Morton was married to Charlotte "Lottie" Goodrich (1858–1938), a daughter of Charles Lowell Goodridge and Charlotte Helen Amelia (née Wheeler) Goodridge. Together, they were the parents of:

- Caroline Morton (1882–1952), who married industrialist and banker William Chapman Potter in 1902. They divorced in October 1922, and she married Harry F. Guggenheim in 1923. They divorced in July 1939, and she married John H. A. Williams.
- Pauline Joy Morton (1887–1955), who became an influential figure in the Republican party, and played an important role in the Repeal of Prohibition in the United States; she married James H. Smith Jr. in 1907. They divorced in 1914, and she married Charles H. Sabin in 1916. After his death in 1933, she married Dwight F. Davis in 1936, and remained married until his death in 1945.

Morton died in New York City on January 19, 1911. His widow died at her residence, One Sutton Place South in New York City, in 1938.

Government offices
Preceded by William H. Moody	United States Secretary of the Navy; July 1, 1904 – June 30, 1905	Succeeded by Charles J. Bonaparte
