= Florina (apple) =

Apple cultivar

Malus pumila 'Florina'
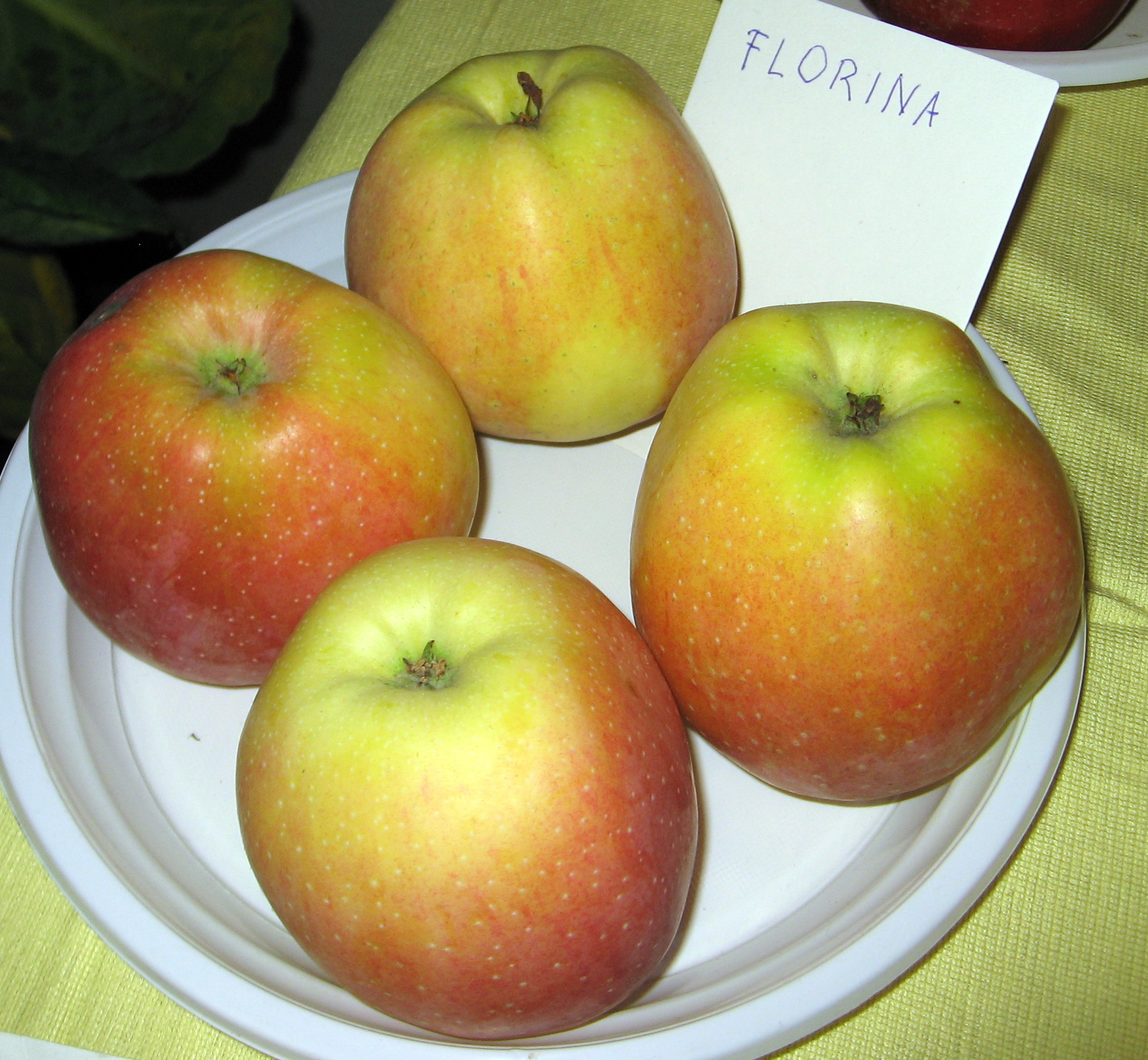
- Genus: Malus
- Species: Malus pumila
- Hybrid parentage: 612-1 x Jonathan
- Cultivar: 'Florina'
- Origin: France, Angers

Florina which is also called Querina, is a French cultivar of domesticated apple, that has combined traits of the Jonathan, Golden Delicious and Rome apples, and was developed in Angers, France, by the "Station de Recherches d'Arboriculture Fruitiere". Although developed in France its ancestry is entirely American.

Florina bears medium to large fruit, skin very attractive, purple red covering almost completely the yellow background. Flesh is medium firm and aromatic, a blend of sweet and tart, uses mainly for fresh eating. Sugar 13.4% Acid 0.57%. Fruits keeps well for approximately three months. As most apples it is self-incompatible and needs out-cross pollination, Florina is a good pollinator for other.

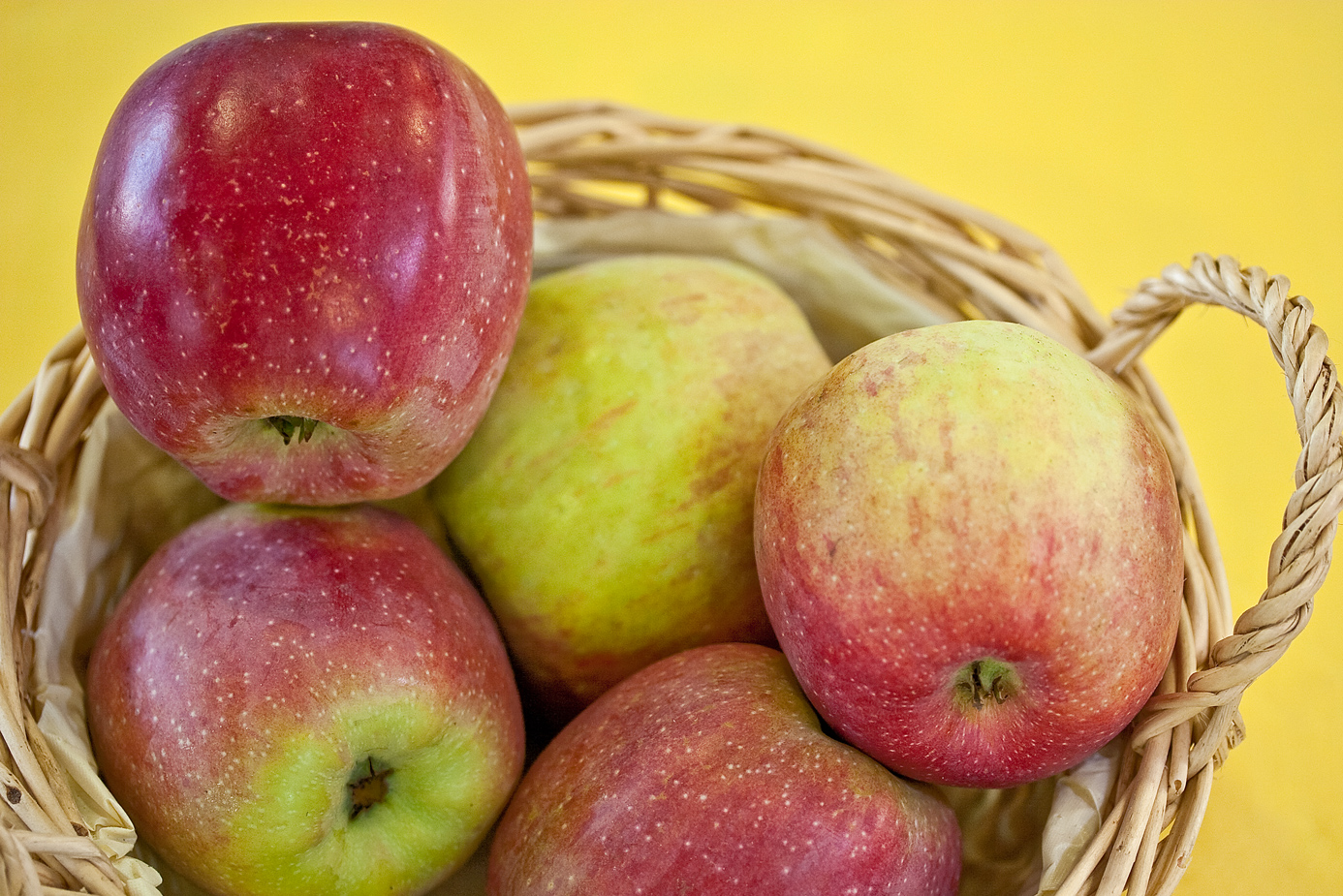
Florina apples.

== See also ==
- Ariane (apple)
