= Karmijn de Sonnaville =

Apple cultivar

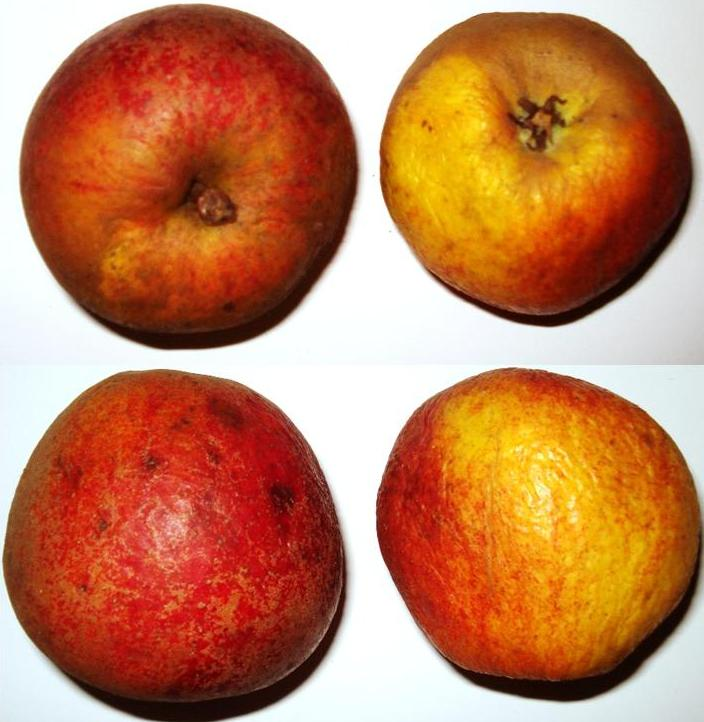
- Genus: Malus
- Species: Malus domestica
- Hybrid parentage: Cox's Orange Pippin x Jonathan
- Cultivar: 'Karmijn de Sonnaville'
- Origin: the Netherlands

Karmijn de Sonnaville is a variety of apple bred by Piet de Sonnaville, working in Wageningen (the Netherlands) in 1949. It is a cross of Cox's Orange Pippin and Jonathan, and was first grown commercially in 1971.

It is high both in sugars (including some sucrose) and acidity. It is a triploid, and hence needs good pollination, and can be difficult to grow. It also suffers from fruit russet, which can be severe. In Manhart's book "Apples for the 21st century", Karmijn de Sonnaville is tipped as a possible success for the future, but as time passes, it seems less likely to make it to the big-time.

Karmijn de Sonnaville is not widely grown in large quantities, but at 8 acres (32,000 m^{2}) The Apple Farm in Ireland it is grown for eating and juice-making, for which the variety is well suited.

Piet de Sonnaville died in 1995, but was still involved in apple breeding at that time; his son Ben, who lives in Altforst in the Netherlands, continues to grow apples and breed new varieties.
