= Melrose (apple) =

Apple cultivar

Malus domestica
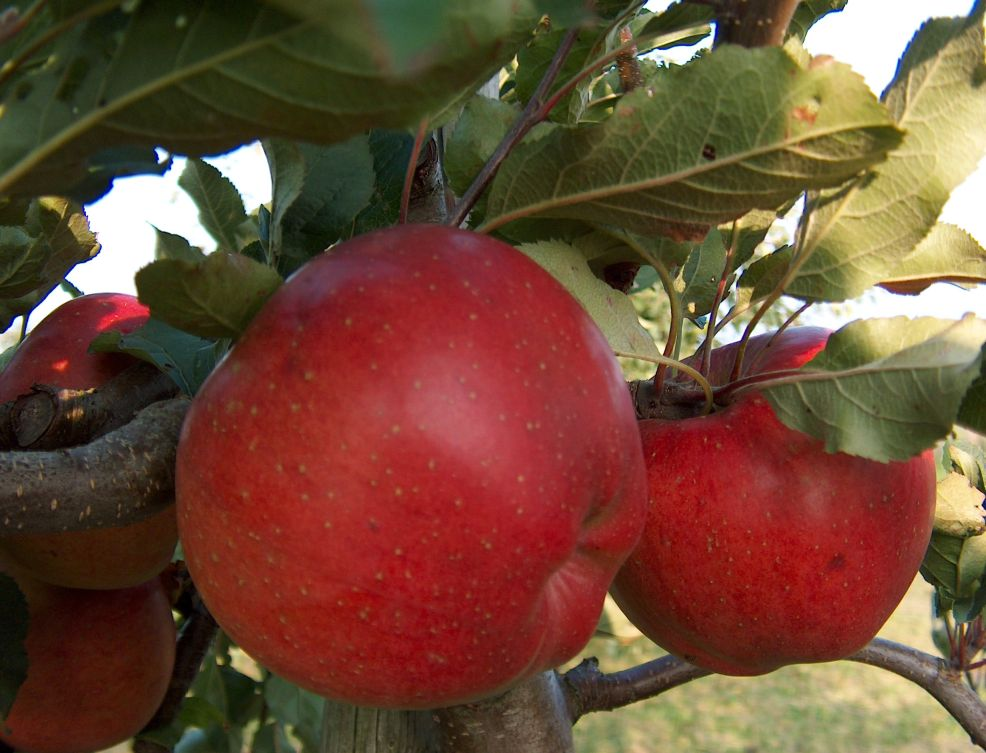
- Species: Malus domestica
- Hybrid parentage: Jonathan × Red Delicious
- Cultivar: Melrose
- Breeder: Freeman Howlett
- Origin: (United States) Wooster, Ohio, 1937

Melrose is a cultivated variety or cultivar of domesticated apple originally from Ohio, United States. It is the official state apple of Ohio.

Freeman Howlett made a cross between the Jonathan and the Red Delicious apples at the Ohio Agricultural Experiment Station in Wooster, Ohio in 1931. The Melrose was selected in 1937 and commercially introduced in 1944.

It is large oblate fruit, streaked and flushed with dark red over a background of yellowish-green skin, with spots of russetting near the stem. The flesh is creamy white, of firm and coarse texture, and juicy. The flavor is aromatic and mildly acidic, similar to Jonathan, but not as tart. It can be used as dessert and for making apple pie.

Melrose apples ripen in late fall. It can last for 100 days in cold storage (1-2 °C) or 180 days in controlled atmosphere with scrubber. The Melrose is susceptible to apple scab and slightly vulnerable to powdery mildew.
