= Dave Kohn =

American dramatist

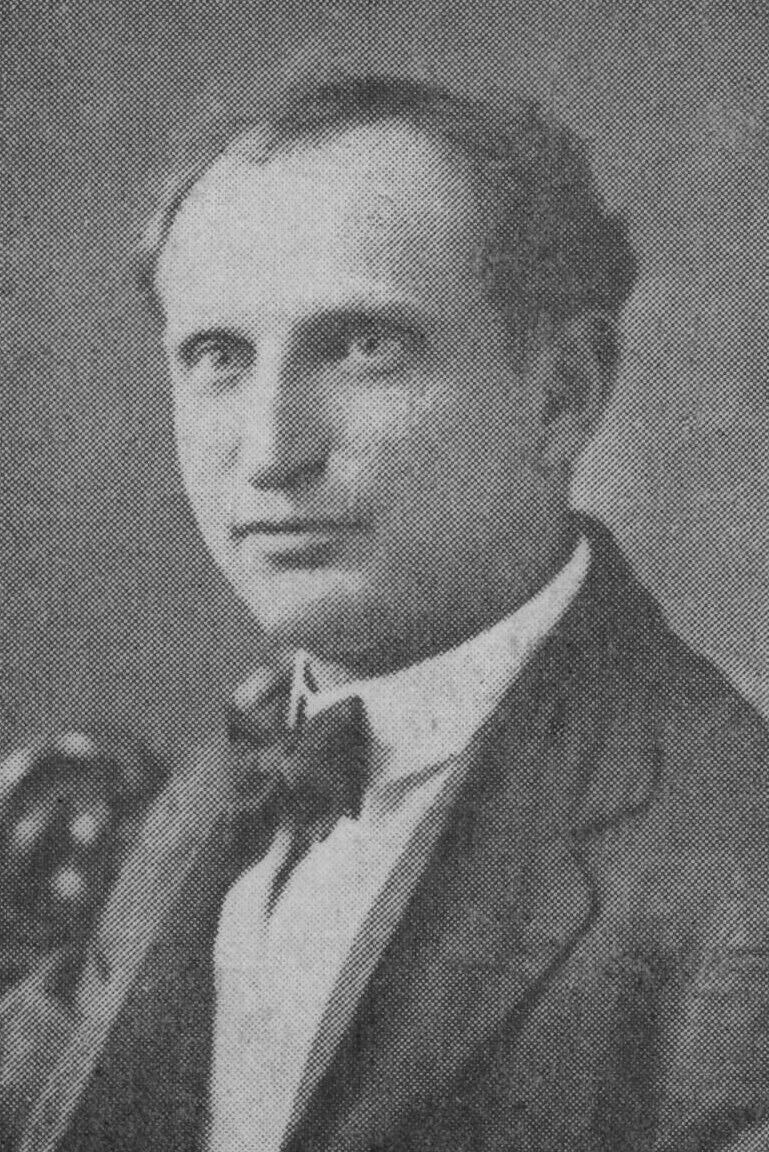

David Kohn (fl. 1912–1922) was an American songwriter and playwright. He was best known for songs involving World War I and Prohibition.

== Career ==
In 1912, Dave Kohn wrote a five-act dramatic play named Bismarck, the Iron Chancellor, which was prepared for a tour in 1913, but this was cancelled due to the outbreak of war the following year.

His 1917 song "The Ocean Must Be Free", cowritten with Lew Flint, was published with the caption "Dedicated to the United States Army and Navy to encourage enlistment". It was reviewed favorably by Billboard: "The Ocean Must Be Free is an exceptionally good title for a song at the present time and the words and music are as good as the title." The Music News described it as, "a very attractive new song which has one of the best Patriotic texts yet noted." After the war, it was advertised in a 1919 issue of the trade publication National Farmer and Stock Grower as a "splendid international song...Our boys could not help fighting for it." It received praise from public figures such as John Philip Sousa and Theodore Roosevelt. Kohn performed the song himself at several venues in Illinois.

In 1918, Kohn wrote the lyrics and E.C. Penn wrote the music for the song "Right and Justice Must Everywhere Prevail". He also cowrote the lyrics to 1919's "Peace Reigns on Earth" with Carolyne Lamberton, music by Bert Keene and Ernest L. Walker.

In 1922, Kohn's song "Light Wine and Beer" (cowritten with George Vest Jr., music by Bert Keene) was taken up by the Anti-Prohibition Party and Association Against the Prohibition Amendment as their official song.

Kohn ran a book shop on 10th Street in St. Louis in the 1920s, where he would write songs for customers on demand.
