= Jonadel =

Apple cultivar

Malus 'Jonadel'
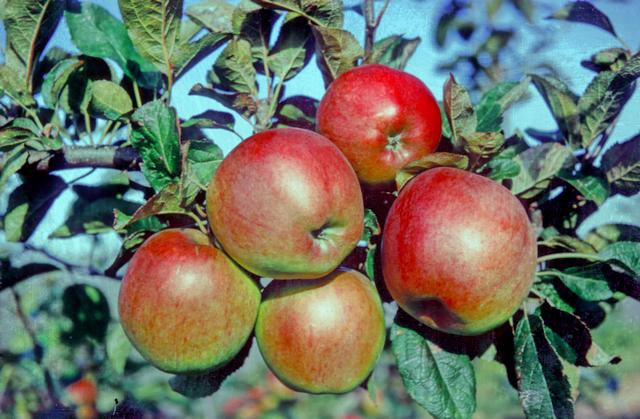
- Species: Malus domestica
- Hybrid parentage: 'Jonathan' × 'Red Delicious'
- Cultivar: 'Jonadel'
- Origin: Ames, Iowa, USA, 1923

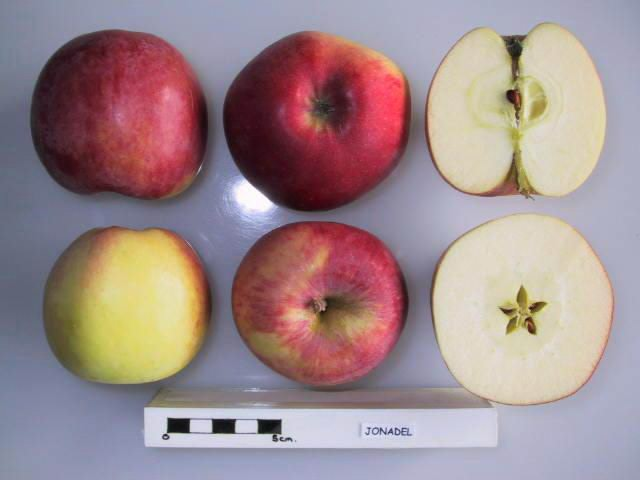
Cross section of Jonadel, National Fruit Collection (acc. 1963–112)

Jonadel is a cultivar of apple which was raised in 1923 at the Iowa Agricultural Experiment Station, Ames, Iowa, United States, a cross between the Jonathan and the Red Delicious. It was introduced in 1958.

Jonadel has a green-yellow basic color with a streaked orange covering color.
