= Mark Morton (businessman) =

American businessman and philanthropist (1858–1951)

Mark Morton (November 22, 1858 – June 25, 1951) was an American businessman and philanthropist. He co-founded the Morton Salt Company.

== Early life ==
He was born in 1858 in Omaha, Nebraska. His father, J. Sterling Morton, was acting territorial governor of Nebraska, a former United States Secretary of Agriculture, and founder of Arbor Day. His mother, Caroline Joy Morton, was the only Caucasian woman present at the signing of the 1854 "Treaty with the Omaha" which paved the way for Nebraska's statehood. He grew up at the family home at Arbor Lodge, and attended public schools in Nebraska City.

At the age of 18, Mark Morton went to work for his older brother, Paul Morton, as a clerk for the Burlington Railroad. In 1882, he became a salesman for the Harvey Lumber Co. of Chicago, and in 1890 was made superintendent of the main plant of the Nebraska City Packing Co. Later in life, he was also president of the Western Cold Storage Company (a major builder and provider of refrigerated storage facilities and railroad cars for the meatpacking industry).

== Morton Salt and other business ventures ==
Morton and his second-eldest brother, Joy, were lifelong business partners. In 1885, he and Joy Morton co-founded the Joy Morton Lumber Co. They later co-founded the Morton Sand and Gravel Company.

They purchased Richmond and Company, a salt distributor in 1886 and renamed it Joy Morton and Company. Mark Morton was the company's vice president and one of its directors from its founding until his retirement in 1922. The company became the International Salt Company in 1902. Morton was forced to testify in federal court in 1903 after government investigators accused the company of antitrust violations. The company was incorporated in Illinois as the Morton Salt Company in 1910.

Morton was an active member of the Employers' Association of Greater Chicago, and was the anti-union organization's president in 1905.

== Family life and scandal ==
Mark Morton married the former Martha Parkhurst Weare. The couple had four children: Laura, Helen, Joy and Jane. Martha Morton died in 1947.

His family life was something of an unhappy one. In 1914, his daughter Helen Morton eloped with Col. Roger Bayly. Morton tracked down his daughter and challenged the marriage on the grounds that she was mentally deranged. A court ruled in his favor, and Helen Morton was committed to an asylum. The marriage and institutionalization was a national scandal which highly embarrassed Mark Morton. When the distinguished journalist Webb Miller attempted to interview Helen Morton, Mark Morton kidnapped him and drove off with Miller tied up in the trunk of his car. Morton crashed the automobile, and police discovered the bound Miller in the vehicle. Miller sued Morton, but won only a minimal payment six years later.

== Retirement and death ==
In 1931, after his retirement, Mark Morton built a mansion and settled in what is now Carol Stream (DuPage County), Illinois. He raised and bred horses, cattle, sheep and many other animals. He was one of the co-founders of the International Livestock Exhibition. He was seriously injured in 1937 when a train struck his car at a crossing.

He died at his home after a lengthy illness on June 25, 1951, at the age of 92. He left the bulk of his $750,000 fortune to charity.
