= Jonathan (apple) =

Apple cultivar

Malus domestica
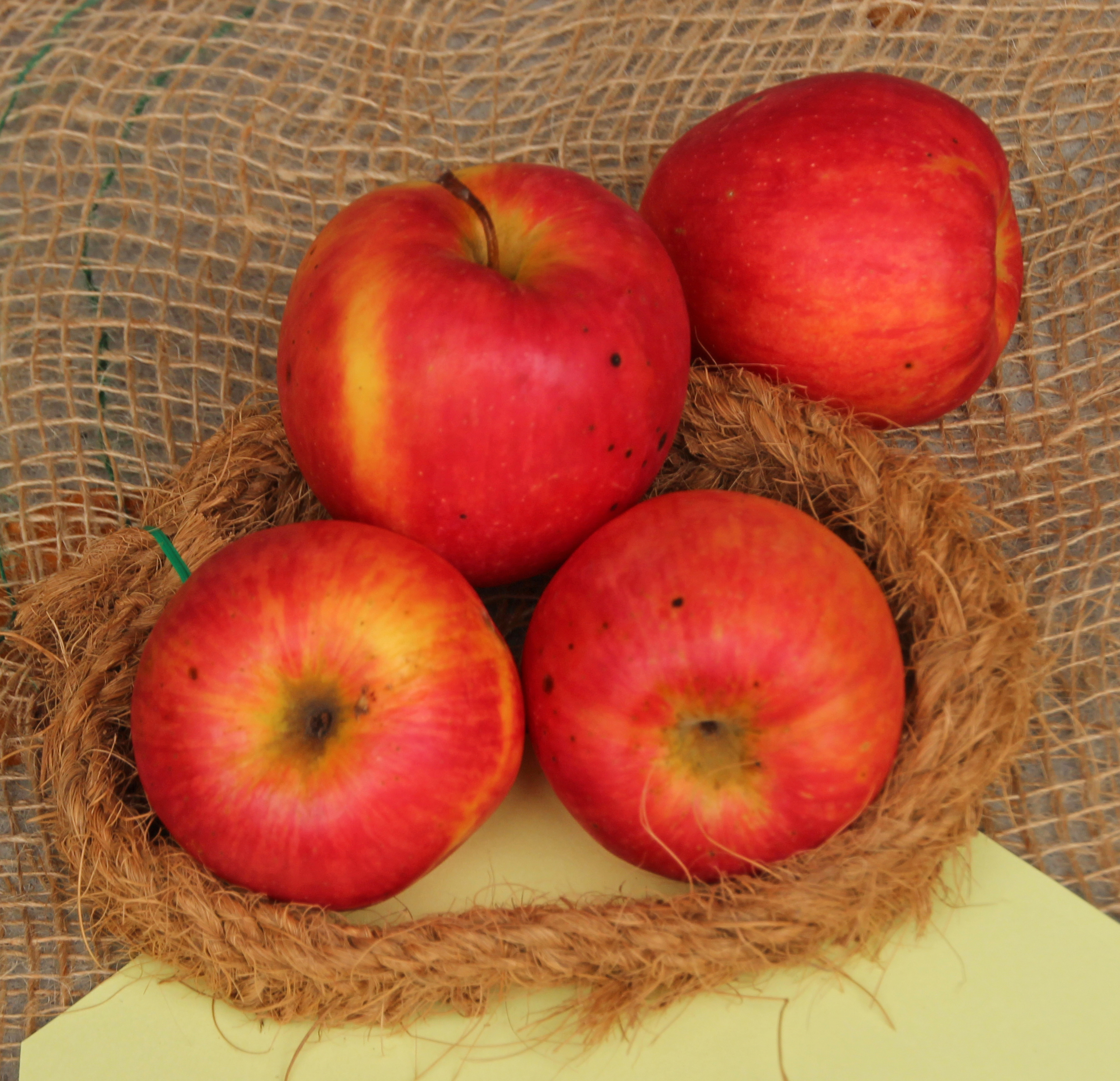
- Species: Malus domestica
- Hybrid parentage: Esopus Spitzenburg × unknown
- Cultivar: Jonathan
- Origin: Woodstock, New York, before 1826

Jonathan is a cultivated variety or cultivar of apple, thought to have originated from the town of Woodstock, New York, United States in the nineteenth century. It has been used to breed many new cultivars.

== Description ==
One of the parents of the Jonathan is the Esopus Spitzenburg but the other remains unknown. Jonathan is a medium-sized apple, with tough and dry but smooth skin. It has white flesh, whose texture is firm and juicy. Its taste has a touch of acid. It is suitable for dessert, applesauce, apple pie (if used alongside a sweet variety), and apple cider.

Typical size distribution
<55 mm	55-60 mm	60-65 mm	65-70 mm	70-75 mm
9 %	17 %	38 %	31 %	5 %

- Sugar 12.5%
- Acid 7.7 g/litre
- Vitamin C 5mg/100g.

The Jonathan is one of the few self-fertile apple trees. It bears heavy crops annually.

== History ==
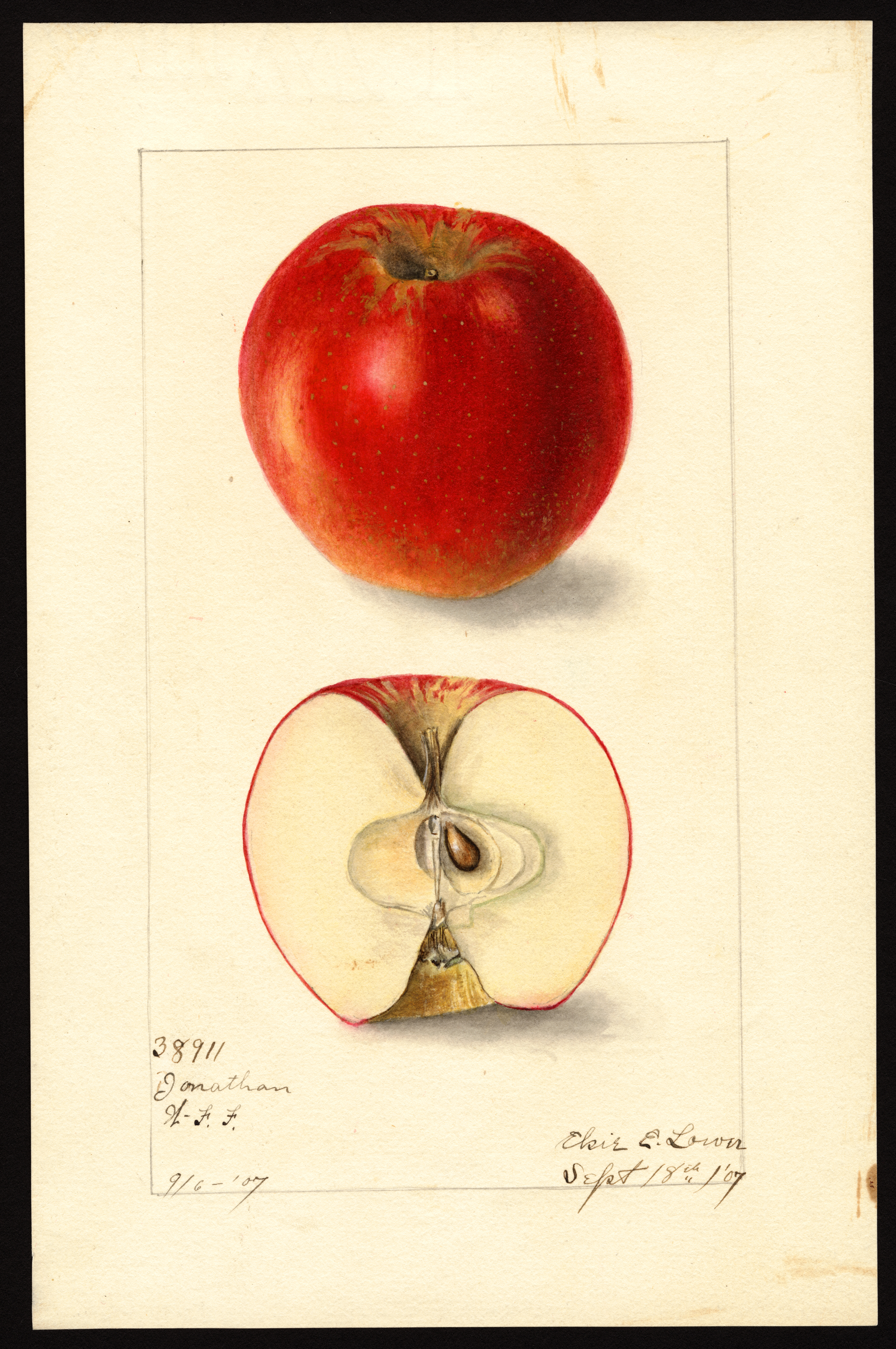
The Jonathan apple in the Pomological Watercolor Collection of the U.S. Department of Agriculture

There are two alternative theories about the origin of the Jonathan apple.

The first theory; it was grown by Rachel Negus Higley, who gathered seeds from the local cider mill in Connecticut. This was before the family made their journey to the wilds of Ohio in 1796, where she planted them. She continued to carefully cultivate her orchard to maturity and named the resulting variety after a young local boy, Jonathan Lash, who frequented her orchard.

The other, more accepted, theory is that it originated from an Esopus Spitzenburg seedling in 1826, on the farm of Philip Rick(s) in Woodstock, Ulster County, New York. A DNA profiling study supports this descent. Although it may have originally been called the "Ricks" apple, it was soon renamed by Judge Jesse Buel, President of Albany Horticultural Society, after Jonathan Zander, who discovered the apple and brought it to Buel's attention.

== Descendants ==
- Akane — Jonathan x Worcester Pearmain
- Florina — complex hybrid (Jonathan lineage)
- Idared — Jonathan x Wagener
- Jonadel — Jonathan x Delicious
- Jonafree — Jonathan x PRI 1018-10
- Jonagold — Golden Delicious x Jonathan
- Jonamac — Jonathan x McIntosh
- Jonared — sport of Jonathan, originated in 1963, Missouri.
- Karmijn de Sonnaville — Cox Orange x Jonathan.
- King David — Jonathan x Winesap
- Malling Kent — Cox Orange x Jonathan
- Mareda — Jonathan x Northern Spy
- Melrose — Jonathan x Delicious
- Red Prince — Jonathan x Golden Delicious
- Septer — Jonathan x Golden Delicious
- Wealthy — Jonathan x Duchess of Oldenburg.

== Disease susceptibility ==
- Scab: High
- Powdery mildew: High
- Cedar apple rust: High
- Fire blight: High
- Apple canker: Medium
