= Southern Cotton Oil Company =

- U.S. National Register of Historic Places
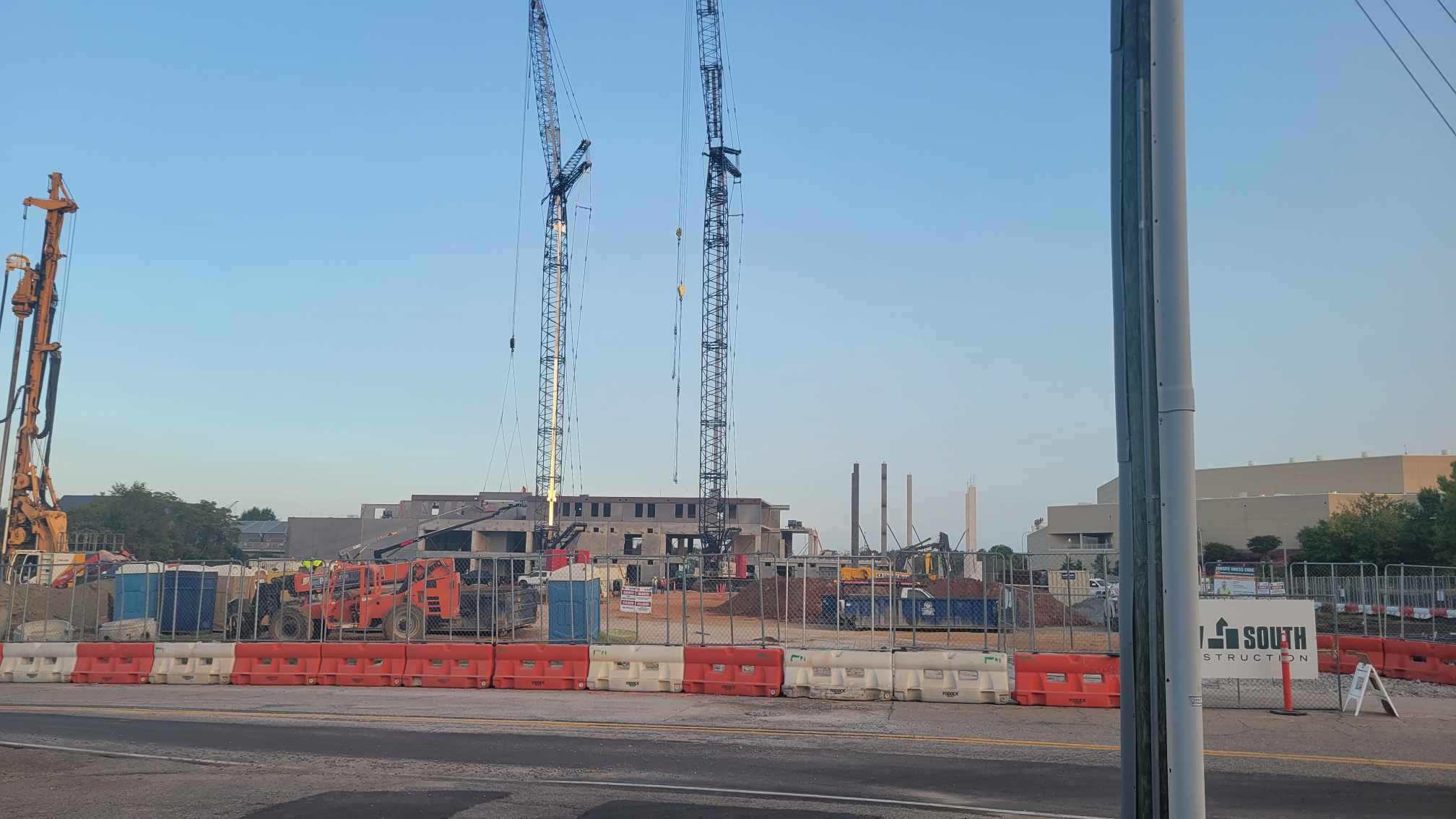
- Construction work on the building site

- Location within South Carolina Location within the United States
- Location: 737 Gadsden St., Columbia, South Carolina
- Coordinates: 33°59′34″N 81°2′16″W
- Area: 4 acres (1.6 ha)
- Built: 1887-1919
- Architectural style: Late 19th And 20th Century Revivals
- NRHP reference No.: 94001552
- Added to NRHP: July 25, 1996

Southern Cotton Oil Company, also known as Columbia Mill, was a historic cottonseed oil complex located at Columbia, South Carolina. The complex was built between 1887 and 1919. It consisted of seven industrial buildings: the Seed House, Linter Room, Press Room, Machine Shop, Oil House, Cotton Storage Room, and Storage Shed. Five of the buildings were constructed of brick and the other two were constructed of galvanized sheet metal. The complex has been demolished.

It was added to the National Register of Historic Places in 1996.
