= Joy Morton =

American businessman (1855–1934)

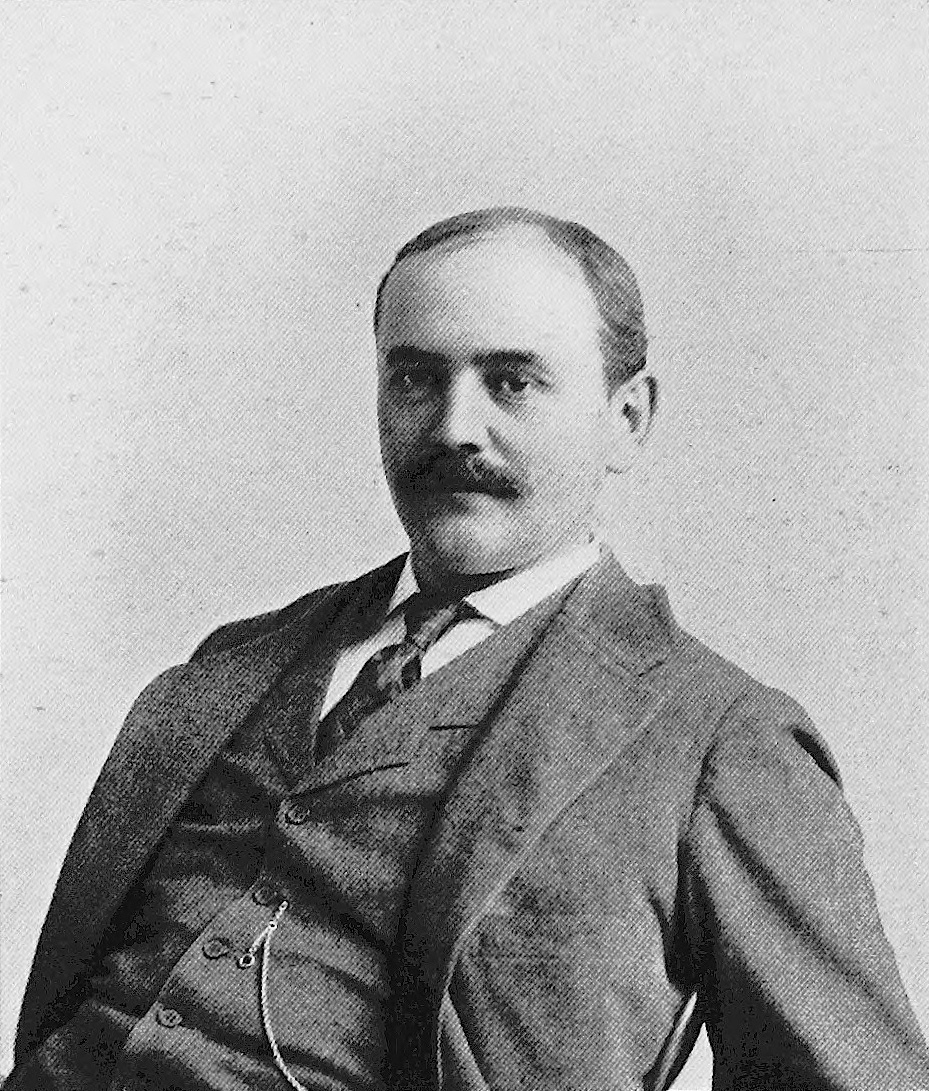
- Born: September 27, 1855; Detroit, Michigan, U.S.
- Died: May 10, 1934 (aged 78); Lisle, Illinois, U.S.
- Occupation: Entrepreneur
- Known for: Morton Salt
- Spouse(s): Carrie Jane Lake (m. 1880; died 1915) Margaret Gray (m. 1917; died 1934)
- Children: Jean Cudahy; Sterling Morton
- Parent(s): Julius Sterling Morton; Caroline Joy French
- Relatives: Paul Morton (brother); Mark Morton (brother); Pauline Sabin (niece)

Joy Sterling Morton (September 27, 1855 – May 10, 1934) was an American businessman and entrepreneur best known for founding Morton Salt and establishing the Morton Arboretum in Lisle, Illinois.

== Early life ==
Morton was born on September 27, 1855, in Detroit, Michigan. His mother, Caroline Joy, was an accomplished artist, musician, and gardener. His father, Julius Sterling Morton, a newspaperman and a leader in Nebraska territorial and state politics, played a key role in establishing Arbor Day, and served as the United States secretary of agriculture in the second administration (1893–1897) of President Grover Cleveland. His younger brothers included Paul Morton and Mark Morton.

== Career ==
At 15, Morton began to manage the family farm and estate. He also took a job at the local bank. At age 18, he fell ill with spinal meningitis. Needing physical exercise and an outdoor environment for full recovery, he farmed his own land for two years. Later, he worked for railroads in Omaha, Nebraska, and Aurora, Illinois, before joining a Chicago salt distribution company in 1880. By 1886, he owned the firm, renaming it Joy Morton and Company, and branching out into the distribution and processing of agricultural products in Nebraska and Illinois. In 1910, he incorporated his salt firm as the Morton Salt Company. He remained the company's president until 1930, when Daniel Peterkin, Sr., became president while Morton served as chairman of the board until his death in 1934.

=== Brand names ===
Among Morton's brands are Morton Salt and Argo Starch. Morton also supported the development of the teleprinter and formed the Morkrum company with the inventor Howard Krum. The company was later renamed to Morkrum-Kleinschmidt, then to Teletype Corporation. It was sold to American Telephone & Telegraph Company in 1930 for $30,000,000.

=== Civic contributions ===
Morton took an active interest in the future of Chicago, chairing the Chicago Commercial Club’s railway terminal committee for Daniel Burnham's and Edward Bennett’s 1909 Plan of Chicago. Morton also served on the Chicago Plan Commission for 25 years and was a staunch advocate of inland waterway transportation and building air rights. His advocacy of air rights in Chicago helped make possible the construction of buildings above railway lines, such as the Merchandise Mart. Throughout his life, Morton believed that inland waterways were essential to the development of commerce and to the growth of cities. Morton Salt was the last firm to use the Illinois and Michigan Canal and the Hennepin Canal to transport goods from Chicago to the Quad Cities via the Mississippi River before the United States entered into World War I.

=== Morton Arboretum ===
Morton tree dedication ceremony at The Dawes Arboretum

In 1922, Morton established the Morton Arboretum on 178 acres (0.72 km^{2}) of land adjacent to his estate in Lisle, Illinois. Today, the Morton Arboretum has grown to 1,700 acres (6.9 km^{2}). As Morton began to define the direction his arboretum should take, he sought the advice of Charles Sprague Sargent, the director of Harvard’s Arnold Arboretum. They agreed that the Morton Arboretum should exist to display woody plants that grow in temperate zones around the world, to educate the public about them, and to conduct research on their management and preservation.

=== Arbor Lodge ===
After his father's death, he hired the architect Jarvis Hunt to redesign and enlarge Arbor Lodge into a 52-room mansion and used it as his family's summer home. After he began his own arboretum, Morton honored his father by giving Arbor Lodge, the family estate known as the birthplace of Arbor Day, to the state of Nebraska as its first state park. Arbor Lodge is officially known as Arbor Lodge State Historical Park and Arboretum.

== Personal life ==
In 1880, Morton married Carrie Jane Lake, the daughter of Nebraska Supreme Court Judge George Lake. They had two children:

- Jean Morton (1883–1953), who married Joseph Cudahy of a Chicago meatpacking company.
- Sterling Morton (1885–1961), who married Sophia Preston Owsley, a granddaughter of Carter Henry Harrison, a popular mayor of post-Civil War Chicago).

After the death of his first wife in 1915, he married Margaret Gray, who became a local leader in health care, two years later in 1917.

Morton died in Lisle, Illinois on May 10, 1934.
