= Julius Sterling Morton =

American politician (1832–1902)

Sterling Morton
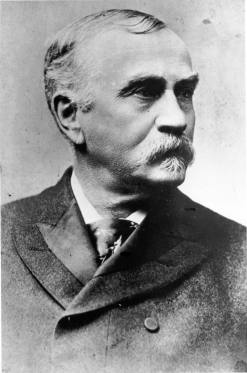

3rd United States Secretary of Agriculture
- In office March 7, 1893 – March 5, 1897
- President: Grover Cleveland; William McKinley
- Preceded by: Jeremiah Rusk
- Succeeded by: James Wilson

Governor of Nebraska Territory
- Acting
- In office February 24, 1861 – March 6, 1861
- Preceded by: Samuel W. Black
- Succeeded by: Algernon Paddock
- In office December 5, 1858 – May 2, 1859
- Preceded by: William Alexander Richardson
- Succeeded by: Samuel W. Black

Personal details
- Born: Julius Sterling Morton; April 22, 1832 Adams, New York, U.S.
- Died: April 27, 1902 (aged 70) Lake Forest, Illinois, U.S.
- Party: Democratic
- Spouse: Caroline French (m. 1854; died 1881)
- Children: Joy, Paul, Mark, Carl
- Education: University of Michigan, Ann Arbor (BA)

Julius Sterling Morton (April 22, 1832 – April 27, 1902) was a Nebraska newspaper editor and politician who served as President Grover Cleveland's secretary of agriculture. He was a prominent Bourbon Democrat, taking a conservative position on political, economic, and social issues, and opposing agrarianism. Among his most notable achievements was the founding of Arbor Day in 1872. In 1897 he started a weekly magazine entitled The Conservative.

== Early life ==
Morton was born on April 22, 1832, in the town of Adams in Jefferson County, New York; his parents, Julius Dewey Morton and Emeline Sterling Morton, ran a general store. In 1834, his parents and his grandfather, Abner Morton, moved to Monroe, Michigan, south of Detroit on Lake Erie; there, Morton's grandfather and his paternal uncle Edward Morton operated a newspaper. When he was fourteen, Morton's parents sent him to Wesleyan Seminary in Albion, Michigan, about 100 miles (160 km) northwest.

In 1850, Morton enrolled in the University of Michigan. In his junior year he attempted to launch a new periodical, the Peninsular Quarterly and University Magazine, which proved short-lived. He was an active member of the Chi Psi fraternity, and opposed an attempt by the faculty to discourage such secret societies.

In May 1854, six weeks before Morton was due to graduate, the university's Board of Regents dismissed the head of the medical department, Dr. J. Adams Allen, a popular faculty member. That evening, Morton, a friend and admirer of Allen's, addressed a mass meeting protesting Allen's dismissal and other seemingly autocratic actions taken by university officials. The following day, Morton was expelled from the university, ostensibly for excessive absences and for general inattention to his duties as a student. His expulsion prompted protests from the student body and across the state. He was readmitted after signing a very conditional document, stating that if the charges against him had been true, then his expulsion would have been justified. The readmission did not last. The university president, Henry Philip Tappan, released a version of his statement from which the conditionals had been removed, making it a straightforward admission of fault. Morton wrote a letter to the Detroit Free Press in which he retracted his original statement, declaring that he had not "...meanly petitioned, implored and besought the Faculty for mercy, for... the Latin-scratched integument of a dead sheep." He was re-expelled and not allowed to graduate with his class. In 1856, under unclear circumstances, he was awarded an honorary Bachelor of Arts degree by Union College of Schenectady, New York; in 1858, the University of Michigan faculty reversed his expulsion and awarded him a diploma.

== Career ==
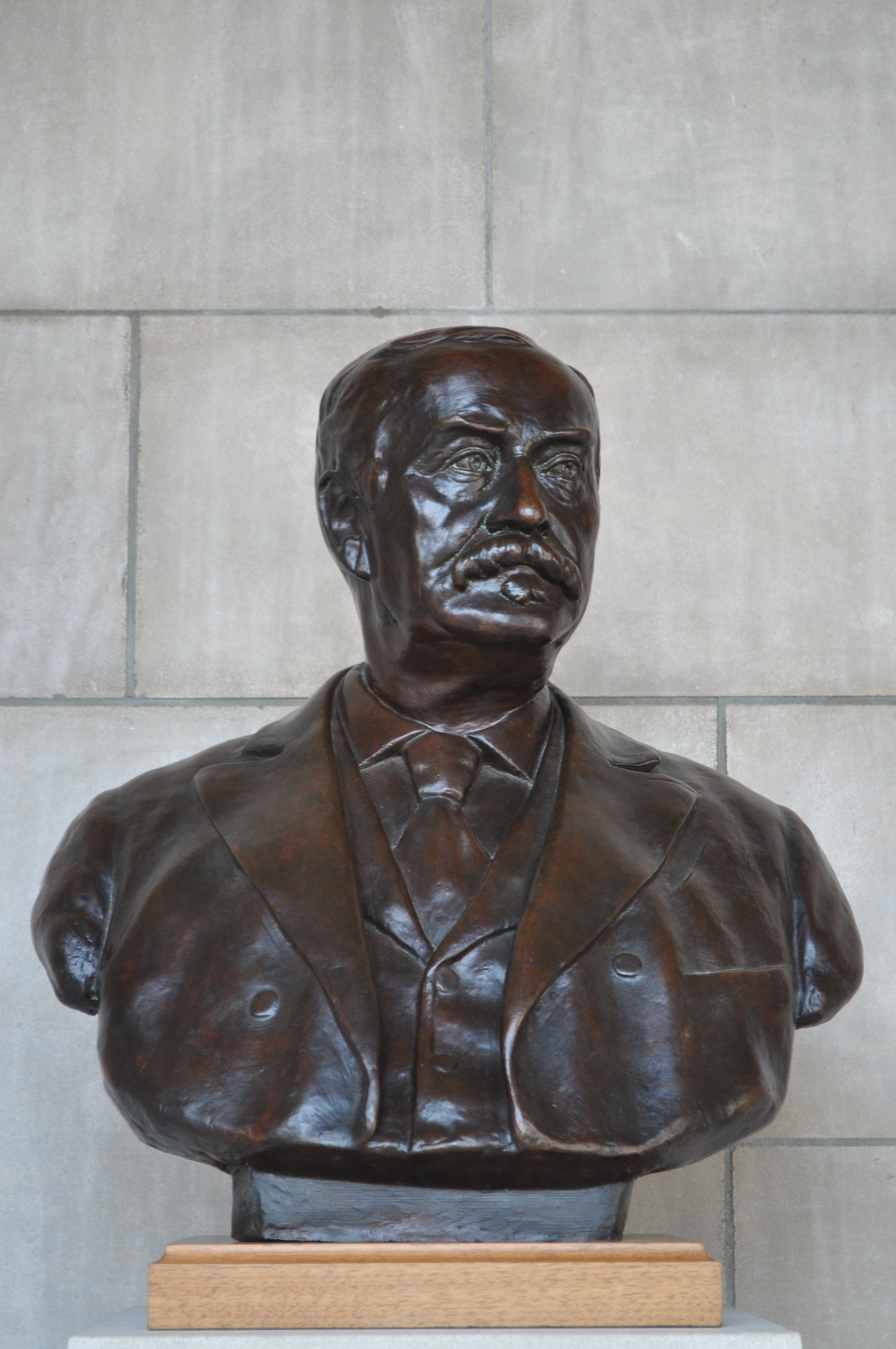
Bust of Morton by Rudolph Evans, created in 1896 for the Nebraska Hall of Fame.

At the age of 22, in fall 1854, he moved with his bride, Caroline Joy French, to the Nebraska Territory, and in 1855 purchased 160 acres in Nebraska City. Soon after arriving there, Morton became the editor of the local newspaper, the Nebraska City News. Morton served briefly in the Nebraska Territorial House of Representatives (1855–1856). He was appointed Secretary of Nebraska Territory by President James Buchanan on July 12, 1858, a position he held until 1861. The 26 year old Morton also served as Acting Governor of Nebraska from December 5, 1858, to May 2, 1859.

Morton moved to Nebraska City shortly after passage of the Kansas-Nebraska Act to become a Democratic newspaper editor during the turbulent era of "Bleeding Kansas," when southeast Nebraska was an important location for abolitionist mobilization and a stop on the Underground Railroad. Morton used his positions as newspaperman and Secretary of the territory to oppose the so-called "Black Republicans" in the legislature, often using racist arguments. During the Civil War he was a harsh critic of President Lincoln and was considered a racist, Southern-sympathizing, copperhead Democrat with questionable loyalty to the Union, although he supposedly opposed secession as well as abolition. After the war he helped make opposition to Black civil rights a leading issue for Democrats.

In 1860, Morton ran for the office of Delegate to the U.S. House of Representatives from Nebraska. He was originally named the winner by 14 votes and issued a certificate of election by the Governor. But 7 months later and two months after his term began, amid considerable evidence of irregularities in frontier balloting on all sides, the Governor issued a superseding certificate of election to his opponent, the Republican abolitionist Samuel Gordon Daily. When the session of Congress began, it was decided that Daily should be sworn in. Morton contested the outcome, noting that the Governor issued the second certificate in secret, without the concurrence of the Board of Canvassers and without the proper seal. Some said that Daily's certificate was a forgery. The House reviewed the election returns and rejected many votes, mostly for Morton. In the end they found that Daily had won by 150 votes.

In 1897, Morton planned and began to edit the multi-volume Illustrated History of Nebraska. He also began publishing a weekly periodical, The Conservative.

=== Agricultural interests ===
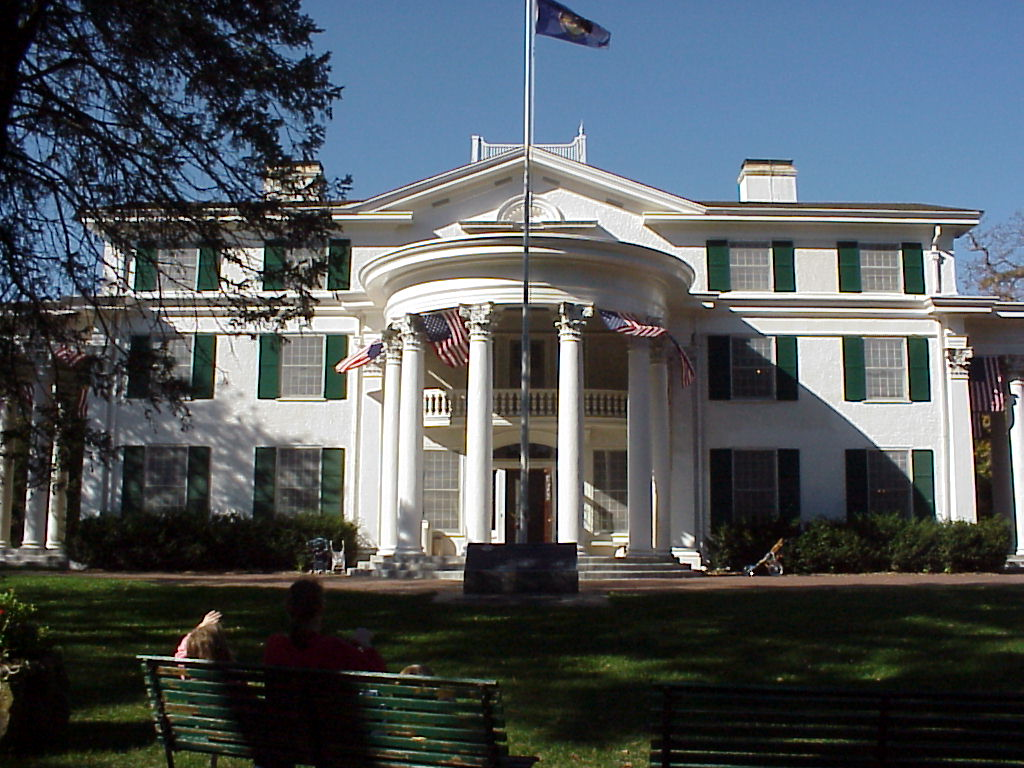
Arbor Lodge

Morton built a 30-room mansion. His son, Joy, expanded it to a 52-room mansion that is a look-alike of the White House in what is now Arbor Lodge State Historical Park, Nebraska City, Nebraska. On the surrounding estate, Morton indulged his fascination with trees, planting many rare varieties and heirloom apple trees. Respected as an agriculturalist, Morton sought to instruct people in the modern techniques of farming and forestry.

Among his most significant achievements was the founding of Arbor Day. He is also remembered for his fierce opposition to cutting down healthy trees as Christmas decorations. He became well known in Nebraska for his political, agricultural, and literary activities and from there was appointed as United States Secretary of Agriculture by President Cleveland (1893–1897). He is credited with helping change that department into a coordinated service to farmers, and he supported Cleveland in setting up national forest reservations.

== Personal life ==
In 1854, Morton was married to Caroline Joy French (1833–1881), the daughter of Hiram Joy and Caroline (née Hayden) Joy, who died when she was an infant. Her foster parents were Cynthia and David French. Together, they were the parents of:

- Joy Sterling Morton (1855–1934), who was the founder of the Morton Salt Company; he married Carrie Jane Lake in 1880. After her death in 1915, he married Margaret Gray in 1917.
- Paul Morton (1857–1911), who was Vice President of the Santa Fe Railroad, President of the Equitable Life Insurance Company, and served as Secretary of the Navy under Teddy Roosevelt; he married Charlotte Goodrich in 1880.
- Mark Morton (1858–1951), who co-founded the Morton Salt Company with his elder brother Joy; he married Martha Parkhurst Weare.
- Carl Morton (1865–1901), the founder of the Argo Starch Company and President of the Glucose Sugar Company; he married Boatie Payne, a daughter of Robert Payne, in 1888.

Morton died on April 27, 1902, in Lake Forest, Illinois, where he was seeking medical treatment; his wife, Caroline, had died two decades earlier, in June 1881. After his wife's death, his sister Emma Morton kept house for him and acted as his political hostess in Nebraska and Washington, D.C. The Morton home and estate in Nebraska City are now a state park, the Arbor Lodge State Historical Park and Arboretum.

=== Legacy ===
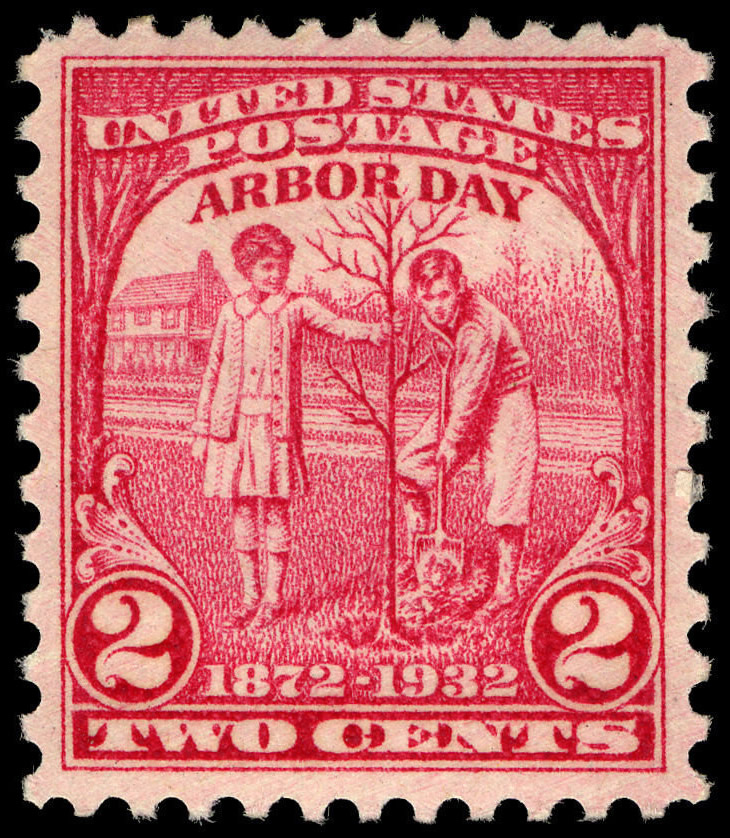
Arbor Day commemorative stamp issued to coincide with the 100th anniversary of J. Sterling Morton's birth

In 1937, the state of Nebraska donated a bronze statue of Morton to the National Statuary Hall Collection at the United States Capitol. However, because of his long history of virulent, unapologetic racism and political corruption, his statue was replaced by a statue of Willa Cather in 2023. Morton is a member of the Nebraska Hall of Fame, inducted in 1975. The J. Sterling Morton Beltway, a highway near Nebraska City, Nebraska, which is made up of U.S. Route 75 and Nebraska Highway 2, is named for him. J. Sterling Morton Magnet Middle School in Omaha, Nebraska, also bears his name, as do Morton College (a community college) and J. Sterling Morton High School District 201 in Berwyn and Cicero, Illinois.

His son, Joy Morton, the founder of the Morton Salt Company, also created The Morton Arboretum in Lisle, Illinois, in 1922. Today, Joy Morton's original 400-acre (1.6 km^{2}) Thornhill Estate, which he acquired in 1910, has been transformed into a 1,700-acre (6.9 km^{2}) living history museum of over 4,000 different types of trees, shrubs, and other woody plants.

== Notes ==
Political offices
Preceded by William Alexander Richardson	Governor of Nebraska; Acting; 1858–1859	Succeeded by Samuel W. Black
Preceded by Samuel W. Black	Governor of Nebraska; Acting; 1861	Succeeded by Algernon Paddock
Preceded by Jeremiah Rusk	United States Secretary of Agriculture; 1893–1897	Succeeded by James Wilson
Party political offices
First	Democratic nominee for Governor of Nebraska; 1866	Succeeded by James R. Porter
Preceded by Thomas Tipton	Democratic nominee for Governor of Nebraska; 1882, 1884	Succeeded by James E. North
Preceded by James Boyd	Democratic nominee for Governor of Nebraska; 1892	Succeeded by Silas A. Holcomb; Affiliated
