= Association Against the Prohibition Amendment =

Defunct US organization working for the repeal of prohibition

The Association Against the Prohibition Amendment was established in 1918 and became a leading organization working for the repeal of prohibition in the United States. It was the first group created to fight Prohibition, also known as the 18th Amendment. The group was officially incorporated on December 31, 1920. Its activities consisted of meetings, protests, and distribution of informational pamphlets and it operated solely upon voluntary financial contribution. Due to low amount of financial contributions, the Association was largely stagnant until prominent members joined in the mid-1920s.

== Development ==
Although the Association Against the Prohibition Amendment (AAPA) formed in 1918, it largely stayed stagnant until prominent members joined in the mid-1920s. Prominent members of the organization included Pierre S. du Pont, Irénée du Pont, John J. Raskob, Jouett Shouse, Grayson M.P. Murphy, and James Wolcott Wadsworth Jr. Its publicity campaign, begun in 1928, helped mobilize growing opposition to the 18th Amendment. It included, as an official song, "Light Wine and Beer" by Dave Kohn and George Vest Jr., music by Bert Keene. Although the Association depended on donations, it refused to accept money from business with a vested interest in alcohol consumption, such as breweries and distilleries. There were over 500,000 members in 28 states.

== Activities ==
In order to promote its cause, the Association distributed over 1,250,000 research pamphlets, often focusing on the negative effects that Prohibition had upon the economy and how it proliferated the amount of illegal distilleries. The Association claimed in the 18 different research pamphlets it distributed that the cessation of Prohibition would help the economy, and later on stated that repealing the 18th Amendment would ultimately help the United States recover from the Great Depression.

== Success and disbandment ==
The Association Against the Prohibition Amendment officially disbanded on December 5, 1933, after the ratification of the Twenty-first Amendment by three-fourths of the states officially ended Prohibition. The Association's final operation was a celebration on the evening of December 5 of 170 members at the Waldorf Astoria Hotel in New York City.

== Notable publications ==
- Du Pont, Pierre S. (1926), Eighteenth Amendment Not a Remedy for the Drink Evil, Washington D.C.: Association Against the Prohibition Amendment, hdl:2027/mdp.39015039331593
- Canada Liquor Crossing the Border, Washington D.C.: Association Against the Prohibition Amendment, 1929, hdl:2027/mdp.39015041742365
- Does Prohibition Pay?, Washington D.C.: Association Against the Prohibition Amendment, 1930, hdl:2027/mdp.39015035011140
- Finland's Prohibition: An Echo of Volsteadism, Washington D.C.: Association Against the Prohibition Amendment, 1930, hdl:2027/mdp.39015039347789
- Norway's Noble Experiment, Washington D.C.: Association Against the Prohibition Amendment, 1931, hdl:2027/mdp.39015039331627
- Prohibition Enforcement: Its Effect on Courts and Prisons, Washington D.C.: Association Against the Prohibition Amendment, 1930, hdl:2027/mdp.39015035011157
- Reforming America with a Shotgun; A Study of Prohibition Killings, Washington D.C.: Association Against the Prohibition Amendment, 1929, hdl:2027/mdp.39015035011272
- Scandals of Prohibition Enforcement, [Pamphlet]no.4, Washington D.C.: Association Against the Prohibition Amendment, 1929, hdl:2027/mdp.39015035011132
- The Bratt System of Liquor Control in Sweden, Washington D.C.: Association Against the Prohibition Amendment, 1930, hdl:2027/mdp.39015071420049

== See also ==
- The Crusaders (repeal of alcohol prohibition)
