= Edward Kleinschmidt =

German-American engineer (1876–1977)

Edward Ernst Kleinschmidt
- Born: September 9, 1876; Bremen, Germany
- Died: August 22, 1977 (aged 100); Canaan, Connecticut, United States
- Engineering career
- Significant advance: Telecommunications

Edward Ernst Kleinschmidt (September 9, 1876 – August 22, 1977) was a German-American engineer. He was one of the inventors of the teleprinter, and obtained 118 patents over the course of his lifetime.

== Career ==
Born in Bremen, Germany, in 1876, Kleinschmidt immigrated to the United States at the age of 8.

Kleinschmidt began working with nascent communications technology in 1893 while still in his teens. He first patented a Morse keyboard transmitter, in 1895 (Patent No. 964,372; filed February 7, 1895; issued January 11, 1910) and later a Morse keyboard perforator. Keyboard perforators were a development from Charles Wheatstone's perforator of 1858, a hand-operated device which produced a punched paper tape for use in automatic telegraph transmitters.

Soon after, he set up the Kleinschmidt Electric Company. With George Seely, he developed signaling equipment for railways. The pair began their work in 1906, and by 1910, they were able to demonstrate a completed device. The signaling technology is still used by railways throughout North America.

In 1916, he filed a patent application for a typebar page printer. In 1919, shortly after the Morkrum company obtained their patent for a start-stop synchronizing method for code telegraph systems, which made possible the practical teleprinter, Kleinschmidt filed an application titled "Method of and Apparatus for Operating Printing Telegraphs" which included an improved start-stop method.

Instead of wasting time and money in patent disputes on the start-stop method, Kleinschmidt and the Morkrum Company decided to merge and form the Morkrum-Kleinschmidt Company in 1924. The new company combined the best features of both their machines into a new typewheel printer for which Kleinschmidt, Howard Krum, and Sterling Morton jointly obtained a patent.

In December 1928, the company name was changed to Teletype Corporation, and in 1930 Teletype Corporation was sold to the American Telephone and Telegraph Company for $30 million. In 1931, Kleinschmidt set up Kleinschmidt Laboratories, presently known as Kleinschmidt Inc, to further refine the teletypewriter and do research and development for the Teletype Corporation.

He was awarded the John Price Wetherill Medal in 1940.

During World War II, Kleinschmidt's son Bernard learned that the U.S. Army Signal Corps needed a lightweight, transportable teleprinter and in February 1944, Kleinschmidt demonstrated a working model of his lightweight teleprinter at the office of the Chief Signal Officer. The Kleinschmidt 100-words-per-minute typebar page printer became the standard for US forces in 1949.

The success of its printer, and an order for 2,000 examples caused Kleinschmidt Laboratories to purchase a 13-acre (53,000 m^{2}) parcel of land in Deerfield, Illinois, to house the manufacturing operations. This location and the original buildings are the current home of Kleinschmidt Inc.

== Other inventions ==
Although best known for the teleprinter, Kleinschmidt also invented many other devices, including an automatic fishing reel and a vaccination shield, and is credited with making major improvements to the Wheatstone (stock market ticker tape) perforator. He also invented a macaroni-twisting machine. His inventions made him a multi-millionaire.

Kleinschmidt died in Canaan, Connecticut, of heart disease in 1977 at the age of 100.

== See also ==
- Kleinschmidt Inc
