= Teleprinter =

Device for transmitting messages in written form by electrical signals

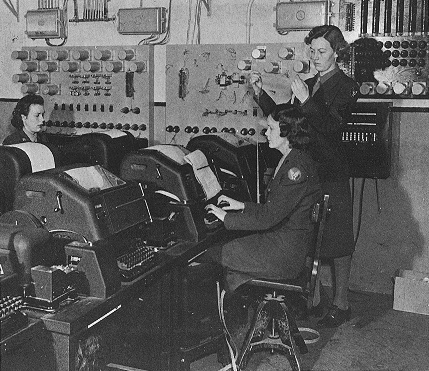
Teletype teleprinters in use in England during World War II

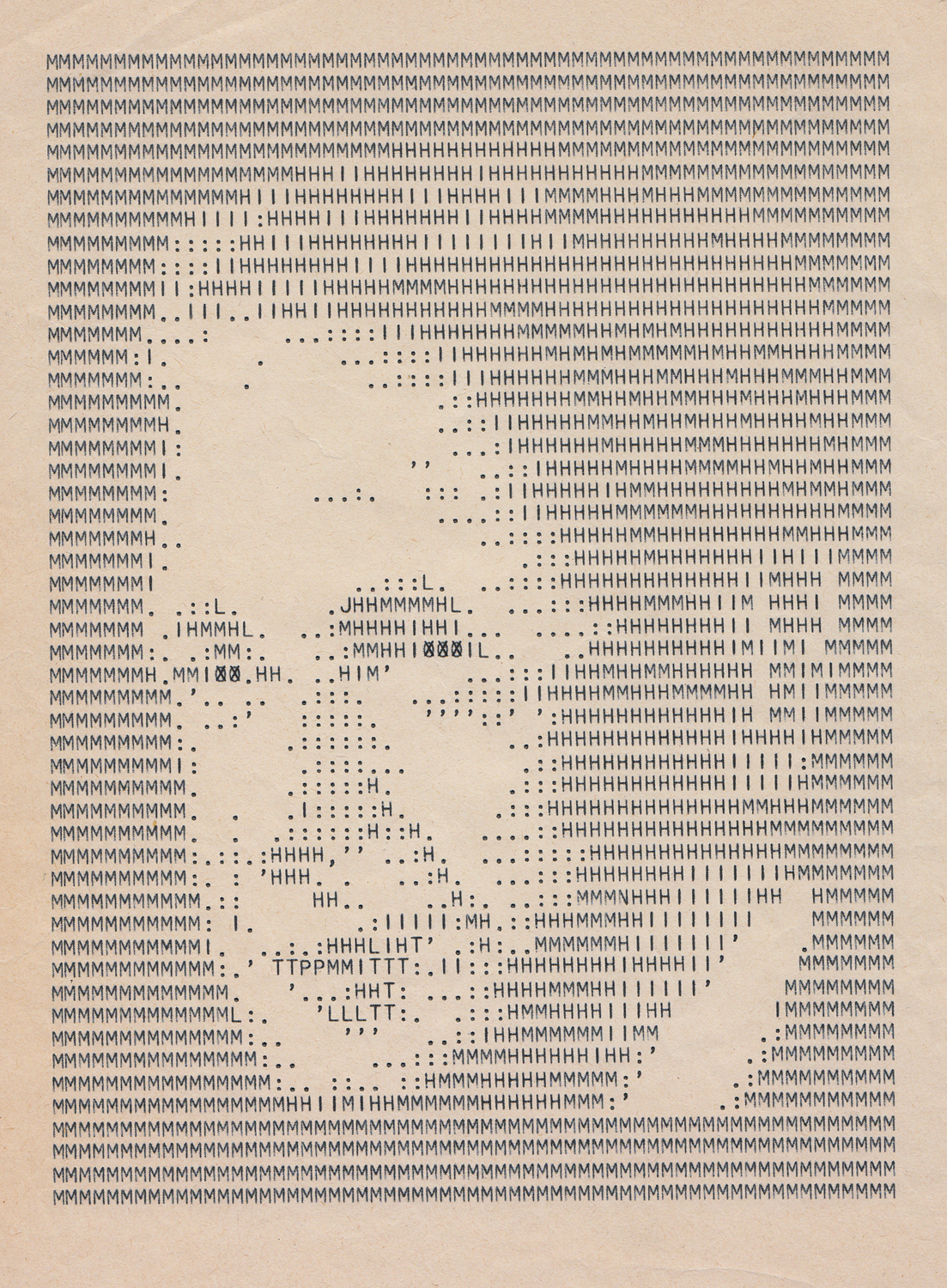
Example of teleprinter art: a portrait of Dag Hammarskjöld, 1962

A teleprinter (teletypewriter, teletype or TTY) is an electromechanical device used to send and receive typed messages through various communications channels, in both point-to-point and point-to-multipoint configurations.

Initially, teleprinters were used in telegraphy. Electrical telegraphy had been developed decades earlier in the late 1830s and 1840s, then using simpler Morse key equipment and telegraph operators. The introduction of teleprinters automated much of this work and eventually largely replaced skilled operators versed in Morse code with typists and machines communicating faster via Baudot code.

With the development of early computers in the 1950s, teleprinters were adapted to allow typed data to be sent to a computer, and responses printed. Some teleprinter models could also be used to create punched tape for data storage (either from typed input or from data received from a remote source) and to read back such tape for local printing or transmission. A teleprinter attached to a modem could also communicate through telephone lines. This latter configuration was often used to connect teleprinters to remote computers, particularly in time-sharing environments.

Teleprinters have largely been replaced by fully electronic computer terminals which typically have a computer monitor instead of a printer (though the term "TTY" is still occasionally used to refer to them, such as in Unix systems). Teleprinters are still widely used in the aviation industry (see AFTN and airline teletype system), and variants called Telecommunications Devices for the Deaf (TDDs) are used by the hard-of-hearing for typed communications over ordinary telephone lines.

== History ==
The teleprinter evolved through a series of inventions by a number of people on both sides of the Atlantic ocean, including Samuel Morse, William Fothergill Cooke, Charles Wheatstone, Alexander Bain, Royal Earl House, David Edward Hughes, Emile Baudot, Donald Murray, Charles L. Krum, Edward Kleinschmidt and Frederick G. Creed.

=== Early developments (1835–1846) ===
In 1835 Samuel Morse devised a recording telegraph, and Morse code was born. Morse's instrument used a current to displace the armature of an electromagnet, which moved a marker, therefore recording the breaks in the current. William Fothergill Cooke and Charles Wheatstone received a British patent covering telegraphy in 1837 and a second one in 1840 which described a type-printing telegraph with steel type fixed at the tips of petals of a rotating brass daisy-wheel, struck by an "electric hammer" to print Roman letters through carbon paper onto a moving paper tape. In 1841 Alexander Bain devised an electromagnetic printing telegraph machine. It used pulses of electricity created by rotating a dial over contact points to release and stop a type-wheel turned by weight-driven clockwork; a second clockwork mechanism rotated a drum covered with a sheet of paper and moved it slowly upwards so that the type-wheel printed its signals in a spiral. The critical issue was to have the sending and receiving elements working synchronously. Bain attempted to achieve this using centrifugal governors to closely regulate the speed of the clockwork. It was patented, along with other devices, on April 21, 1841.

By 1846, the Morse telegraph service was operational between Washington, D.C., and New York. Royal Earl House patented his printing telegraph that same year. He linked two 28-key piano-style keyboards by wire. Each piano key represented a letter of the alphabet and when pressed caused the corresponding letter to print at the receiving end. A "shift" key gave each main key two optional values. A 56-character typewheel at the sending end was synchronised to coincide with a similar wheel at the receiving end. If the key corresponding to a particular character was pressed at the home station, it actuated the typewheel at the distant station just as the same character moved into the printing position, in a way similar to the (much later) daisy wheel printer. It was thus an example of a synchronous data transmission system. House's equipment could transmit around 40 instantly readable words per minute, but was difficult to manufacture in bulk. The printer could copy and print out up to 2,000 words per hour. This invention was first put in operation and exhibited at the Mechanics Institute in New York in 1844.

=== Early teleprinters (1849–1897) ===
Landline teleprinter operations began in 1849, when a circuit was put in service between Philadelphia and New York City.

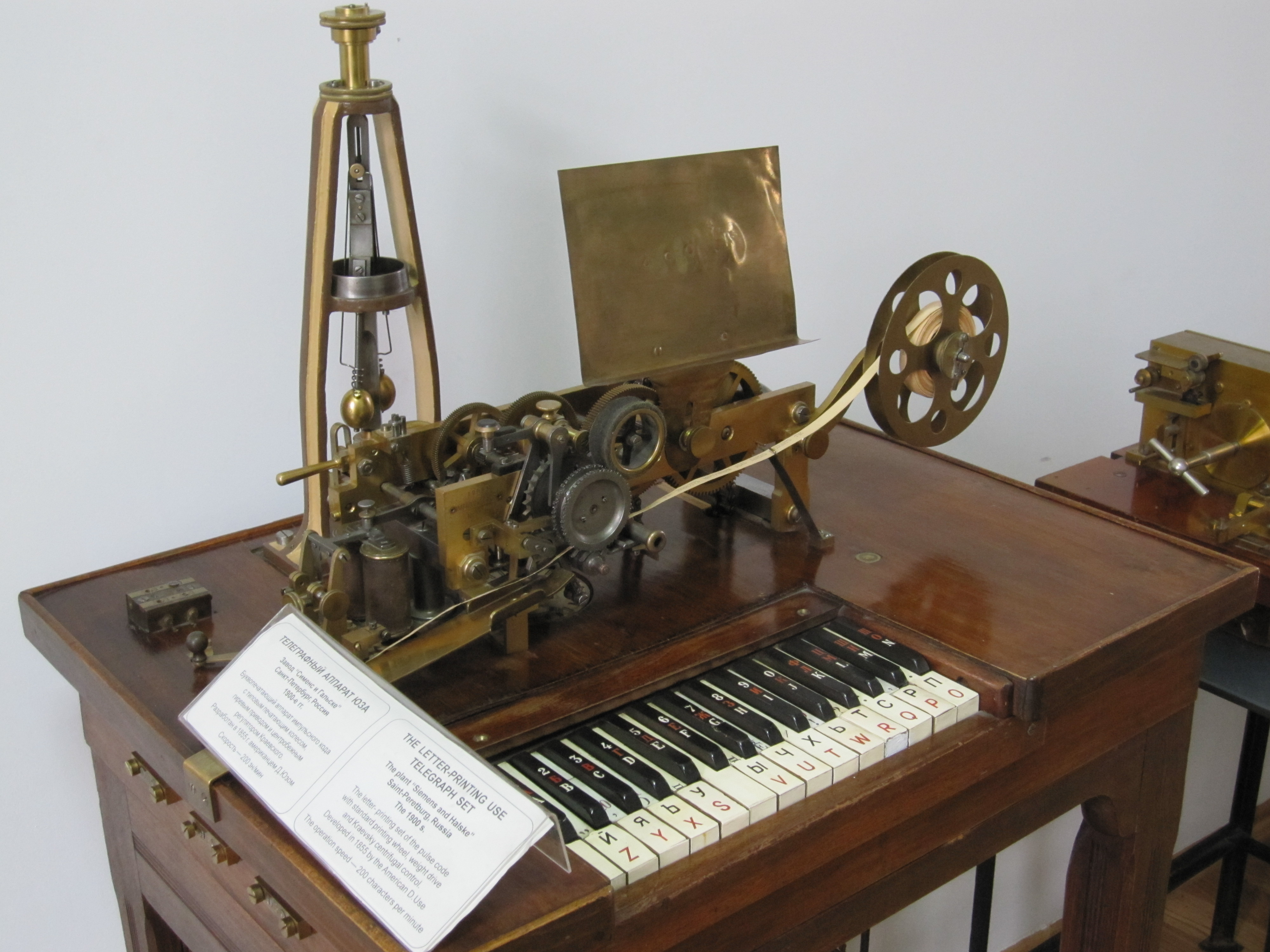
Hughes telegraph, an early (1855) teleprinter built by Siemens and Halske. The centrifugal governor to achieve synchronicity with the other end can be seen.

In 1855, David Edward Hughes introduced an improved machine built on the work of Royal Earl House. In less than two years, a number of small telegraph companies, including Western Union in early stages of development, united to form one large corporation – Western Union Telegraph Co. – to carry on the business of telegraphy on the Hughes system.

In France, Émile Baudot designed in 1874 a system using a five-unit code, which began to be used extensively in that country from 1877. The British Post Office adopted the Baudot system for use on a simplex circuit between London and Paris in 1897, and subsequently made considerable use of duplex Baudot systems on their Inland Telegraph Services.

In Finland, Kaj Himberg in 1875 designed possibly the first six-unit code teleprinter, at least one year prior to when Émile Baudot experimented with a six-bit code which he changed to a five-bit code. Himberg's teleprinter used a nonuniform 6-unit character frame during serial transmission with 64 combinations, but was found to be too clunky and difficult to use, so no more than one was ever made.

=== Twentieth century developments ===
In 1901, Baudot's code was modified by Donald Murray (1865–1945, originally from New Zealand), prompted by his development of a typewriter-like keyboard. The Murray system employed an intermediate step, a keyboard perforator, which allowed an operator to punch a paper tape, and a tape transmitter for sending the message from the punched tape. At the receiving end of the line, a printing mechanism would print on a paper tape, and/or a reperforator could be used to make a perforated copy of the message. As there was no longer a direct correlation between the operator's hand movement and the bits transmitted, there was no concern about arranging the code to minimize operator fatigue, and instead Murray designed the code to minimize wear on the machinery, assigning the code combinations with the fewest punched holes to the most frequently used characters. The Murray code also introduced what became known as "format effectors" or "control characters" – the CR (Carriage Return) and LF (Line Feed) codes. A few of Baudot's codes moved to the positions where they have stayed ever since: the NULL or BLANK and the DEL code. NULL/BLANK was used as an idle code for when no messages were being sent.

In the United States in 1902, electrical engineer Frank Pearne approached Joy Morton, head of Morton Salt, seeking a sponsor for research into the practicalities of developing a printing telegraph system. Joy Morton needed to determine whether this was worthwhile and so consulted mechanical engineer Charles L. Krum, who was vice president of the Western Cold Storage Company. Krum was interested in helping Pearne, so space was set up in a laboratory in the attic of Western Cold Storage. Frank Pearne lost interest in the project after a year and left to get involved in teaching. Krum was prepared to continue Pearne's work, and in August, 1903 a patent was filed for a 'typebar page printer'. In 1904, Krum filed a patent for a 'type wheel printing telegraph machine' which was issued in August, 1907. In 1906 Charles Krum's son, Howard Krum, joined his father in this work. It was Howard who developed and patented the start-stop synchronizing method for code telegraph systems, which made possible the practical teleprinter.

In 1908, a working teleprinter was produced by the Morkrum Company (formed between Joy Morton and Charles Krum), called the Morkrum Printing Telegraph, which was field tested with the Alton Railroad. In 1910, the Morkrum Company designed and installed the first commercial teletypewriter system on Postal Telegraph Company lines between Boston and New York City using the "Blue Code Version" of the Morkrum Printing Telegraph.

Teleprinters were invented in order to send and receive messages without the need for operators trained in the use of Morse code. A system of two teleprinters, with one operator trained to use a keyboard, replaced two trained Morse code operators. The teleprinter system improved message speed and delivery time, making it possible for messages to be flashed across a country with little manual intervention.

In 1916, Edward Kleinschmidt filed a patent application for a typebar page printer. In 1919, shortly after the Morkrum company obtained their patent for a start-stop synchronizing method for code telegraph systems, which made possible the practical teleprinter, Kleinschmidt filed an application titled "Method of and Apparatus for Operating Printing Telegraphs" which included an improved start-stop method. The basic start-stop procedure, however, is much older than the Kleinschmidt and Morkrum inventions. It was already proposed by D'Arlincourt in 1870.

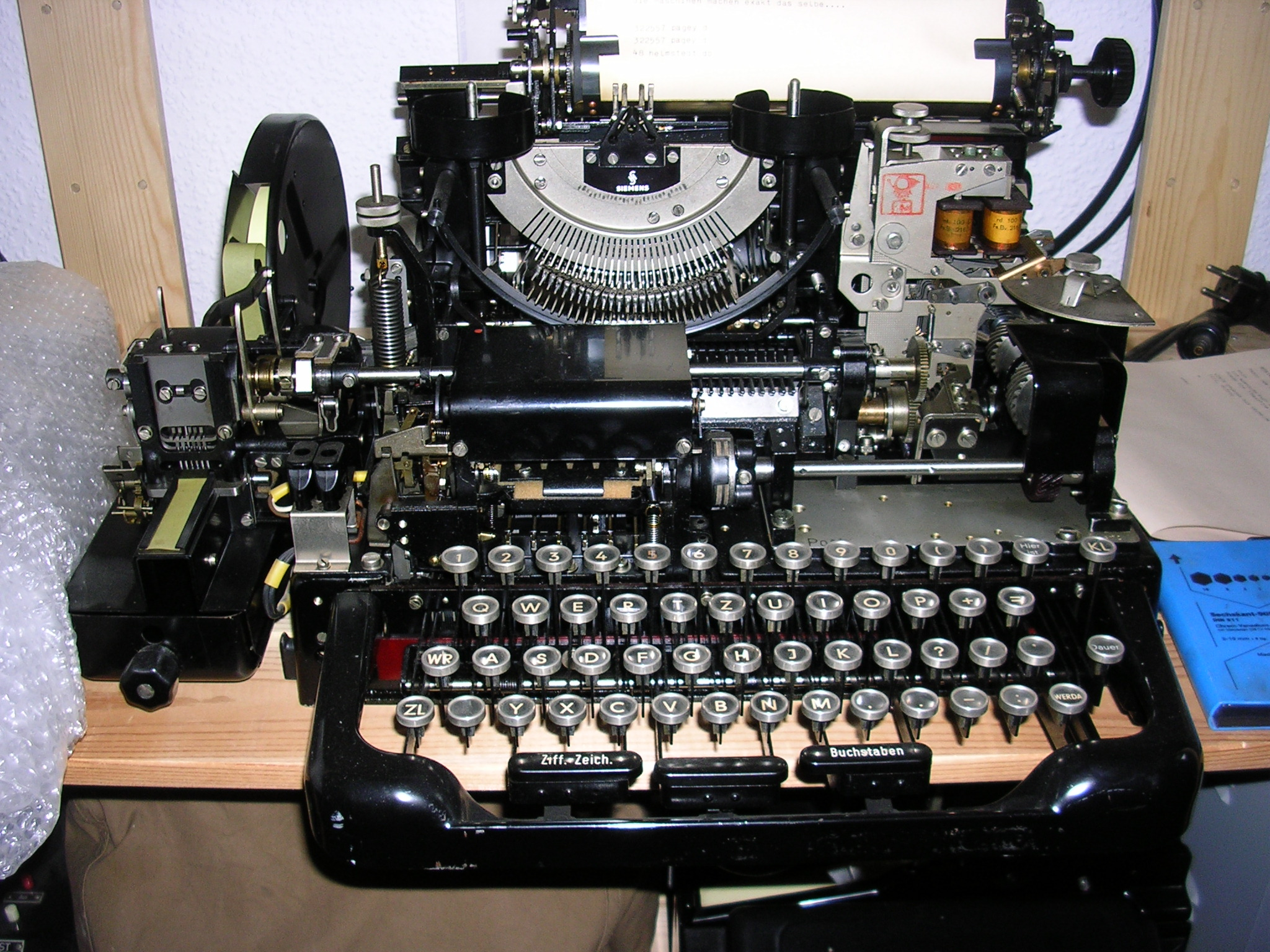
Siemens t37h (1933) without cover

Instead of wasting time and money in patent disputes on the start-stop method, Kleinschmidt and the Morkrum Company decided to merge and form the Morkrum-Kleinschmidt Company in 1924. The new company combined the best features of both their machines into a new typewheel printer for which Kleinschmidt, Howard Krum, and Sterling Morton jointly obtained a patent.

In 1924 Britain's Creed & Company, founded by Frederick G. Creed, entered the teleprinter field with their Model 1P, a page printer, which was soon superseded by the improved Model 2P. In 1925 Creed acquired the patents for Donald Murray's Murray code, a rationalised Baudot code. The Model 3 tape printer, Creed's first combined start-stop machine, was introduced in 1927 for the Post Office telegram service. This machine printed received messages directly on to gummed paper tape at a rate of 65 words per minute. Creed created his first keyboard perforator, which used compressed air to punch the holes. He also created a reperforator (receiving perforator) and a printer. The reperforator punched incoming Morse signals on to paper tape and the printer decoded this tape to produce alphanumeric characters on plain paper. This was the origin of the Creed High Speed Automatic Printing System, which could run at an unprecedented 200 words per minute. His system was adopted by the Daily Mail for daily transmission of the newspaper's contents. The Creed Model 7 page printing teleprinter was introduced in 1931 and was used for the inland Telex service. It worked at a speed of 50 baud, about 66 words a minute, using a code based on the Murray code.

A teleprinter system was installed in the Bureau of Lighthouses, Airways Division, Flight Service Station Airway Radio Stations system in 1928, carrying administrative messages, flight information and weather reports. By 1938, the teleprinter network, handling weather traffic, extended over 20,000 miles, covering all 48 states except Maine, New Hampshire, and South Dakota.

== Ways in which teleprinters were used ==
Teleprinters could use a variety of different communication channels. These included a simple pair of wires, public switched telephone networks, dedicated non-switched telephone circuits (leased lines), switched networks that operated similarly to the public telephone network (telex), and radio and microwave links (telex-on-radio, or TOR).

There were at least five major types of teleprinter networks:

- Exchange systems such as Telex and TWX created a real-time circuit between two machines, so that anything typed on one machine appeared at the other end immediately. US and UK systems had telephone dials, and prior to 1981 five North American Numbering Plan (NANPA) area codes were reserved for teleprinter use. German systems did "dialing" via the keyboard. Typed "chat" was possible, but because billing was by connect time, it was common to prepare messages in advance on paper tape and transmit them without pauses for typing.
- Leased line and radioteletype networks arranged in point-to-point and / or multipoint configurations supported data processing applications for government and industry, such as integrating the accounting, billing, management, production, purchasing, sales, shipping and receiving departments within an organization to speed internal communications.
- Message switching systems were an early form of E-mail, using electromechanical equipment. See telegram services, Western Union, Plan 55-A. Military organizations had similar but separate systems, such as Autodin.
- Broadcast systems such as weather information distribution and "news wires", which were received on "wire machines". Examples were operated by Associated Press, National Weather Service, Reuters, and United Press (later UPI). Information was printed on receive-only teleprinters, without keyboards or dials.
- "Loop" systems, where anything typed on any machine on the loop printed on all the machines. American police departments used such systems to interconnect precincts.

Before the computer revolution (and information processing performance improvements thanks to Moore's law) made it possible to securely encrypt voice and video calls, teleprinters were long used in combination with electromechanical or electronic cryptographic devices to provide secure communication channels. Being limited to text only was an acceptable trade-off for security.

== Teleprinter operation ==
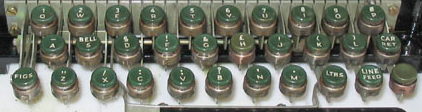
Keyboard of a Baudot teleprinter, with 32 keys, counting the space bar (only partially visible in this picture; the key left blank in this layout is not the space bar)

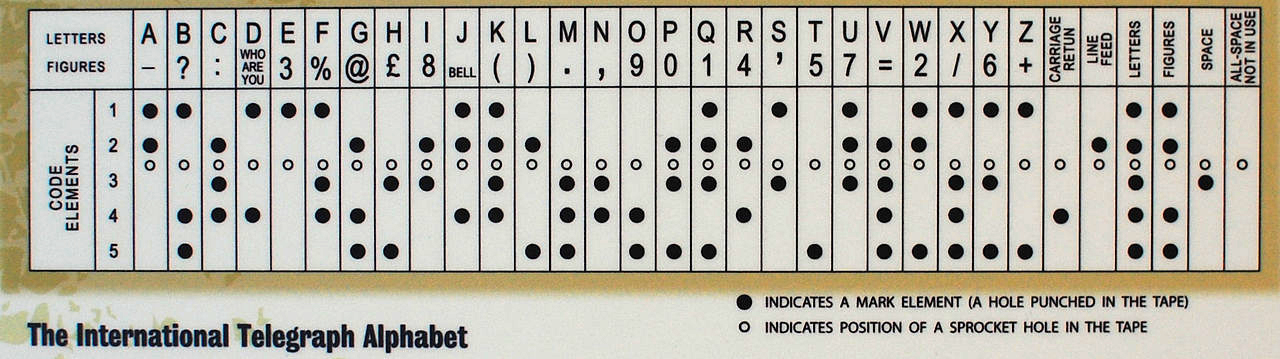
International Telegraph Alphabet No. 2 development of the Baudot–Murray code

Most teleprinters used the 5-bit International Telegraph Alphabet No. 2 (ITA2). This was limited to 32 codes (2^{5} = 32), which was insufficient to encode all the alphabet as well as numbers and other characters. Therefore, the keyboard used the "FIGS" (for "figures") and "LTRS" (for "letters") keys to allow two encoding states, with a total of 60 codes by sending one of two reserved characters to indicate the state of the following encoded stream (the letters were single case only). Special versions of teleprinters had FIGS characters for specific applications, such as weather symbols for weather reports. The ITA2 code was used asynchronously with start and stop bits: the asynchronous code design was intimately linked with the start-stop electro-mechanical design of teleprinters. (Early systems had used synchronous codes, but were hard to synchronize mechanically). Other codes, such as FIELDATA and Flexowriter, were introduced but never became as popular as ITA2.

Mark and space are terms describing logic levels in teleprinter circuits. The native mode of communication for a teleprinter is a simple series DC circuit that is interrupted, much as a rotary dial interrupts a telephone signal. The marking condition is when the circuit is closed (current is flowing), the spacing condition is when the circuit is open (no current is flowing). The "idle" condition of the circuit is a continuous marking state, with the start of a character signalled by a "start bit", which is always a space. Following the start bit, the character is represented by a fixed number of bits, such as 5 bits in the ITA2 code, each either a mark or a space to denote the specific character or machine function. After the character's bits, the sending machine sends one or more stop bits. The stop bits are marking, so as to be distinct from the subsequent start bit. If the sender has nothing more to send, the line simply remains in the marking state (as if a continuing series of stop bits) until a later space denotes the start of the next character. The time between characters need not be an integral multiple of a bit time, but it must be at least the minimum number of stop bits required by the receiving machine.

When the line is broken, the continuous spacing (open circuit, no current flowing) causes a receiving teleprinter to cycle continuously, even in the absence of stop bits. It prints nothing because the characters received are all zeros, the ITA2 blank (or ASCII) null character.

Teleprinter circuits were generally leased from a communications common carrier and consisted of ordinary telephone cables that extended from the teleprinter located at the customer location to the common carrier central office. These teleprinter circuits were connected to switching equipment at the central office for Telex and TWX service. Private line teleprinter circuits were not directly connected to switching equipment. Instead, these private line circuits were connected to network hubs and repeaters configured to provide point to point or point to multipoint service. More than two teleprinters could be connected to the same wire circuit by means of a current loop.

Earlier teleprinters had three rows of keys and only supported upper case letters. They used the 5 bit ITA2 code and generally worked at 60 to 100 words per minute. Later teleprinters, specifically the Teletype Model 33, used ASCII code, an innovation that came into widespread use in the 1960s as computers became more widely available.

"Speed", intended to be roughly comparable to words per minute, is the standard term introduced by Western Union for a mechanical teleprinter data transmission rate using the 5-bit ITA2 code that was popular in the 1940s and several decades thereafter. Such a machine would send 1 start bit, 5 data bits, and 1.42 stop bits. This unusual stop bit time is actually a rest period to allow the mechanical printing mechanism to synchronize in the event that a garbled signal is received. This is true especially on high frequency radio circuits, where selective fading is present. Selective fading causes the mark signal amplitude to be randomly different from the space signal amplitude. Selective fading, or Rayleigh fading can cause two carriers to randomly and independently fade to different depths. Since modern computer equipment cannot easily generate 1.42 bits for the stop period, common practice is to either approximate this with 1.5 bits, or to send 2.0 bits while accepting 1.0 bits receiving.

For example, a "60 speed" machine is geared at 45.5 baud (22.0 ms per bit), a "66 speed" machine is geared at 50.0 baud (20.0 ms per bit), a "75 speed" machine is geared at 56.9 baud (17.5 ms per bit), a "100 speed" machine is geared at 74.2 baud (13.5 ms per bit), and a "133 speed" machine is geared at 100.0 baud (10.0 ms per bit). 60 speed became the de facto standard for amateur radio RTTY operation because of the widespread availability of equipment at that speed and the U.S. Federal Communications Commission (FCC) restrictions to only 60 speed from 1953 to 1972. Telex, news agency wires and similar services commonly used 66 speed services. There was some migration to 75 and 100 speed as more reliable devices were introduced. However, the limitations of HF transmission such as excessive error rates due to multipath distortion and the nature of ionospheric propagation kept many users at 60 and 66 speed. Most audio recordings in existence today are of teleprinters operating at 60 words per minute, and mostly of the Teletype Model 15.

Another measure of the speed of a teletypewriter was in total "operations per minute (OPM)". For example, 60 speed was usually 368 OPM, 66 speed was 404 OPM, 75 speed was 460 OPM, and 100 speed was 600 OPM. Western Union Telexes were usually set at 390 OPM, with 7.0 total bits instead of the customary 7.42 bits.

Both wire-service and private teleprinters had bells to signal important incoming messages and could ring 24/7 while the power was turned on. For example, ringing 4 bells on UPI wire-service machines meant an "Urgent" message; 5 bells was a "Bulletin"; and 10 bells was a FLASH, used only for very important news.

The teleprinter circuit was often linked to a 5-bit paper tape punch (or "reperforator") and reader, allowing messages received to be resent on another circuit. Complex military and commercial communications networks were built using this technology. Message centers had rows of teleprinters and large racks for paper tapes awaiting transmission. Skilled operators could read the priority code from the hole pattern and might even feed a "FLASH PRIORITY" tape into a reader while it was still coming out of the punch. Routine traffic often had to wait hours for relay. Many teleprinters had built-in paper tape readers and punches, allowing messages to be saved in machine-readable form and edited off-line.

Communication by radio, known as radioteletype or RTTY (pronounced ritty), was also common, especially among military users. Ships, command posts (mobile, stationary, and even airborne) and logistics units took advantage of the ability of operators to send reliable and accurate information with a minimum of training. Amateur radio operators continue to use this mode of communication today, though most use computer-interface sound generators, rather than legacy hardware teleprinter equipment. Numerous modes are in use within the "ham radio" community, from the original ITA2 format to more modern, faster modes, which include error-checking of characters.

=== Control characters ===
A typewriter or electromechanical printer can print characters on paper, and execute operations such as move the carriage back to the left margin of the same line (carriage return), advance to the same column of the next line (line feed), and so on. Commands to control non-printing operations were transmitted in exactly the same way as printable characters by sending control characters with defined functions (e.g., the line feed character forced the carriage to move to the same position on the next line) to teleprinters. In modern computing and communications a few control characters, such as carriage return and line feed, have retained their original functions (although they are often implemented in software rather than activating electromechanical mechanisms to move a physical printer carriage) but many others are no longer required and are used for other purposes.

=== Answer back mechanism ===
Some teleprinters had a "Here is" key, which transmitted a fixed sequence of 20 or 22 characters, programmable by breaking tabs off a drum. This sequence could also be transmitted automatically upon receipt of an ENQ (control E) signal, if enabled. This was commonly used to identify a station; the operator could press the key to send the station identifier to the other end, or the remote station could trigger its transmission by sending the ENQ character, essentially asking "who are you?"

== Manufacturers ==
=== Creed & Company ===
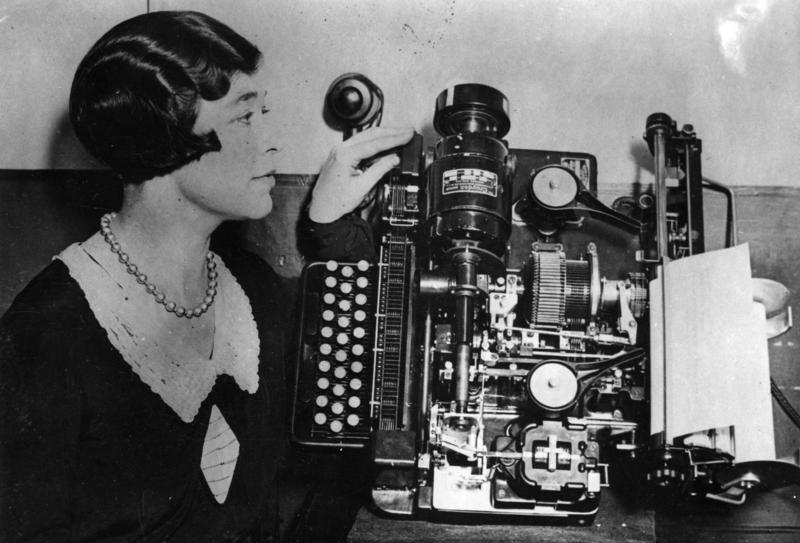
A Creed & Company Teleprinter No. 7 in 1930

British Creed & Company built teleprinters for the GPO's teleprinter service.

- Creed model 7 (page printing teleprinter introduced in 1931)
- Creed model 7B (50 baud page printing teleprinter)
- Creed model 7E (page printing teleprinter with overlap cam and range finder)
- Creed model 7/TR (non-printing teleprinter reperforator)
- Creed model 54 (page printing teleprinter introduced in 1954)
- Creed model 75 (page printing teleprinter introduced in 1958)
- Creed model 85 (printing reperforator introduced in 1948)
- Creed model 86 (printing reperforator using 7/8" wide tape)
- Creed model 444 (page printing teleprinter introduced in 1966, GPO type 15)

=== Gretag ===
The Gretag ETK-47 teleprinter developed in Switzerland by Edgar Gretener in 1947 uses a 14-bit start-stop transmission method similar to the 5-bit code used by other teleprinters. However, instead of a more-or-less arbitrary mapping between 5-bit codes and letters in the Latin alphabet, all characters (letters, digits, and punctuation) printed by the ETK are built from 14 basic elements on a print head, very similar to the 14 elements on a modern fourteen-segment display, each one selected independently by one of the 14 bits during transmission. Because it does not use a fixed character set, but instead builds up characters from smaller elements, the ETK printing element does not require modification to switch between Latin, Cyrillic, and Greek characters.

=== Kleinschmidt Labs ===
In 1931, American inventor Edward Kleinschmidt formed Kleinschmidt Labs to pursue a different design of teleprinter. In 1944 Kleinschmidt demonstrated their lightweight unit to the US Army Signal Corps and in 1949 their design was adopted for the Army's portable needs. In 1956, Kleinschmidt Labs merged with Smith-Corona, which then merged with the Marchant Calculating Machine Co., forming the SCM Corporation. By 1979, the Kleinschmidt division was turning to Electronic Data Interchange and away from mechanical products.

Kleinschmidt machines, with the military as their primary customer, used standard military designations for their machines. The teleprinter was identified with designations such as a TT-4/FG, while communication "sets" to which a teleprinter might be part generally used the standard Army/Navy Joint Electronics Type Designation System (JETDS) nomenclature such as AN/FGC-25, AN/FGC-59 or AN/UGC-74. This includes Kleinschmidt teleprinter TT-117/FG and tape reperforator TT-179/FG.

=== Morkrum ===
Morkrum made their first commercial installation of a printing telegraph with the Postal Telegraph Company in Boston and New York in 1910. It became popular with railroads, and the Associated Press adopted it in 1914 for their wire service. Morkrum merged with their competitor Kleinschmidt Electric Company to become Morkrum-Kleinschmidt Corporation shortly before being renamed the Teletype Corporation.

=== Olivetti ===
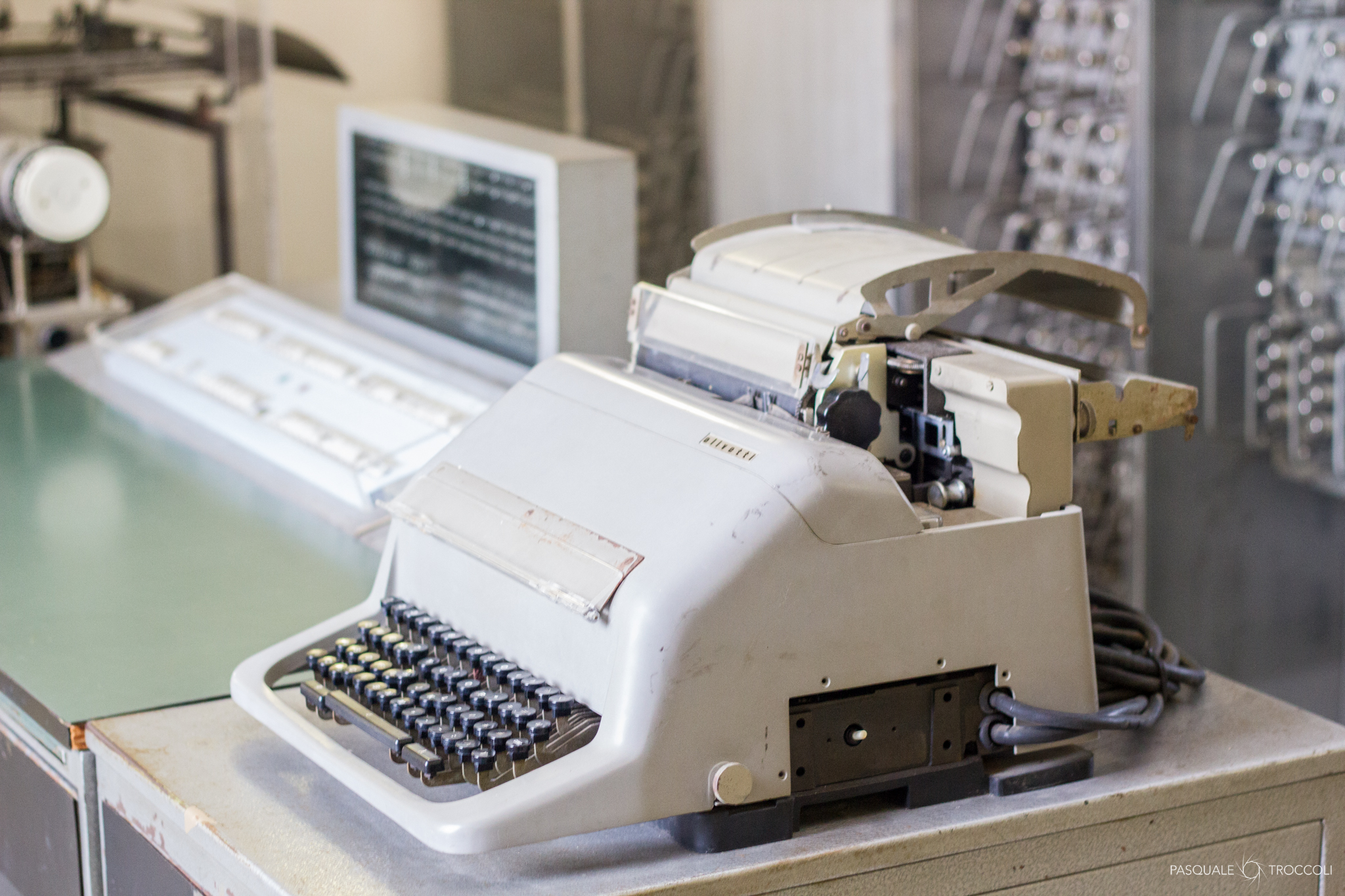
Olivetti Teleprinter

Italian office equipment maker Olivetti (est. 1908) started to manufacture teleprinters in order to provide Italian post offices with modern equipment to send and receive telegrams. The first models typed on a paper ribbon, which was then cut and glued into telegram forms.

- Olivetti T1 (1938–1948)
- Olivetti T2 (1948–1968)
- Olivetti Te300 (1968–1975)
- Olivetti Te400 (1975–1991)

=== Siemens & Halske ===
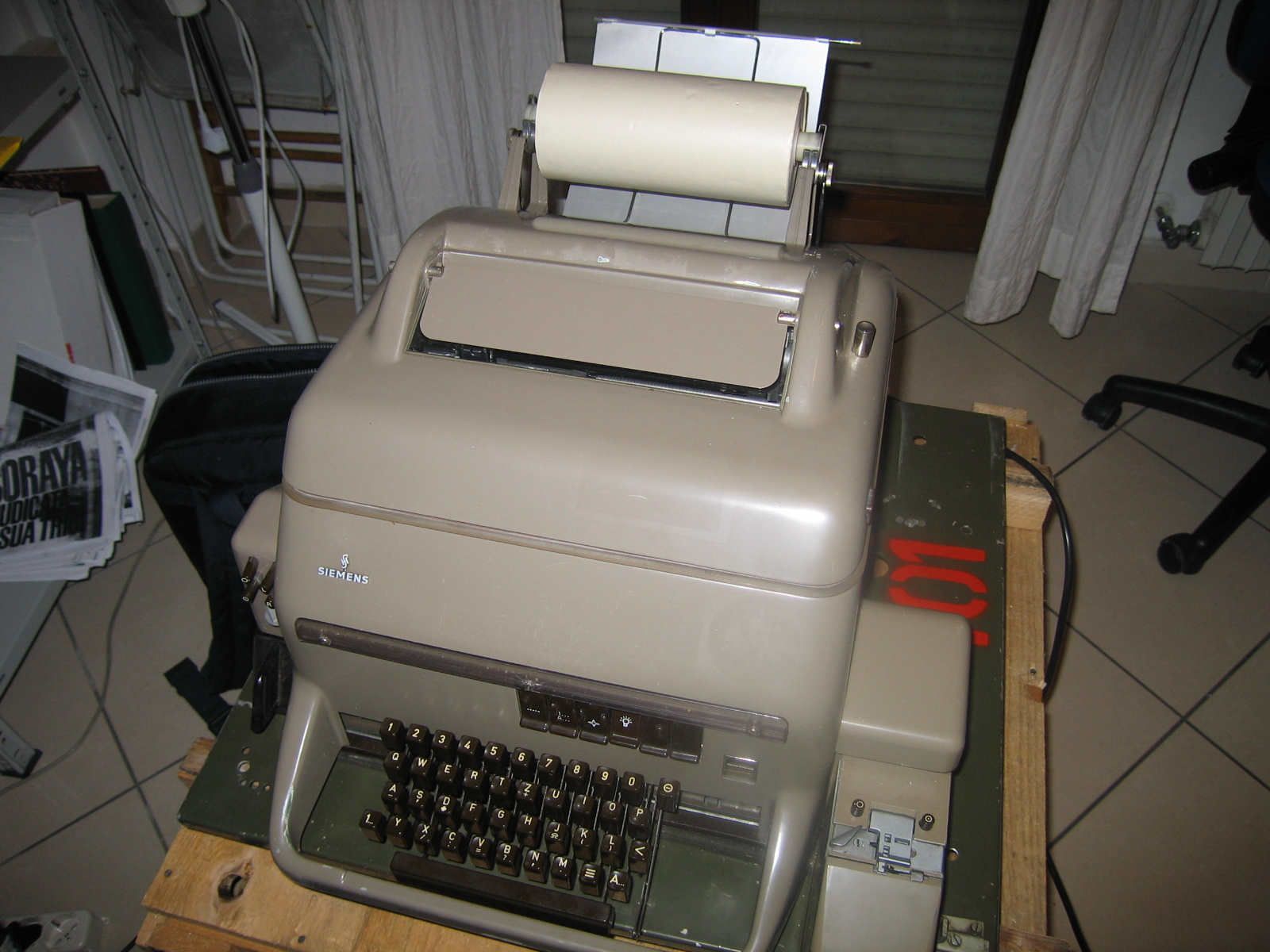
Siemens Fernschreiber 100 teleprinter

Siemens & Halske, later Siemens, a German company, founded in 1847.

- Teleprinter Model 100 Ser 1 (end of the 1950s) – Used for Telex service
- Teleprinter Model 100 Ser. 11 – Later version with minor changes
- Teleprinter Model T100 ND (single current) NDL (double current) models
- Teleprinter Model T 150 (electromechanical)
- Offline tape punch for creating messages
- Teleprinter T 1000 electronic teleprinter (processor based) 50-75-100 Bd. Tape punch and reader attachments ND/NDL/SEU V21modem model
- Teleprinter T 1000 Receive only units as used by newsrooms for unedited SAPA/Reuters/AP feeds etc.
- Teleprinter T 1200 electronic teleprinter (processor based) 50-75-100-200 Bd.Green LED text display, 1.44M 3.5" floppy disk ("stiffy") attachment
- PC-Telex Teleprinter with dedicated dot matrix printer Connected to IBM compatible PC (as used by Telkom South Africa)
- T4200 Teletex Teleprinter With two floppy disc drives and black and white monitor/daisy wheel typewriter (DOS2)

=== Teletype Corporation ===
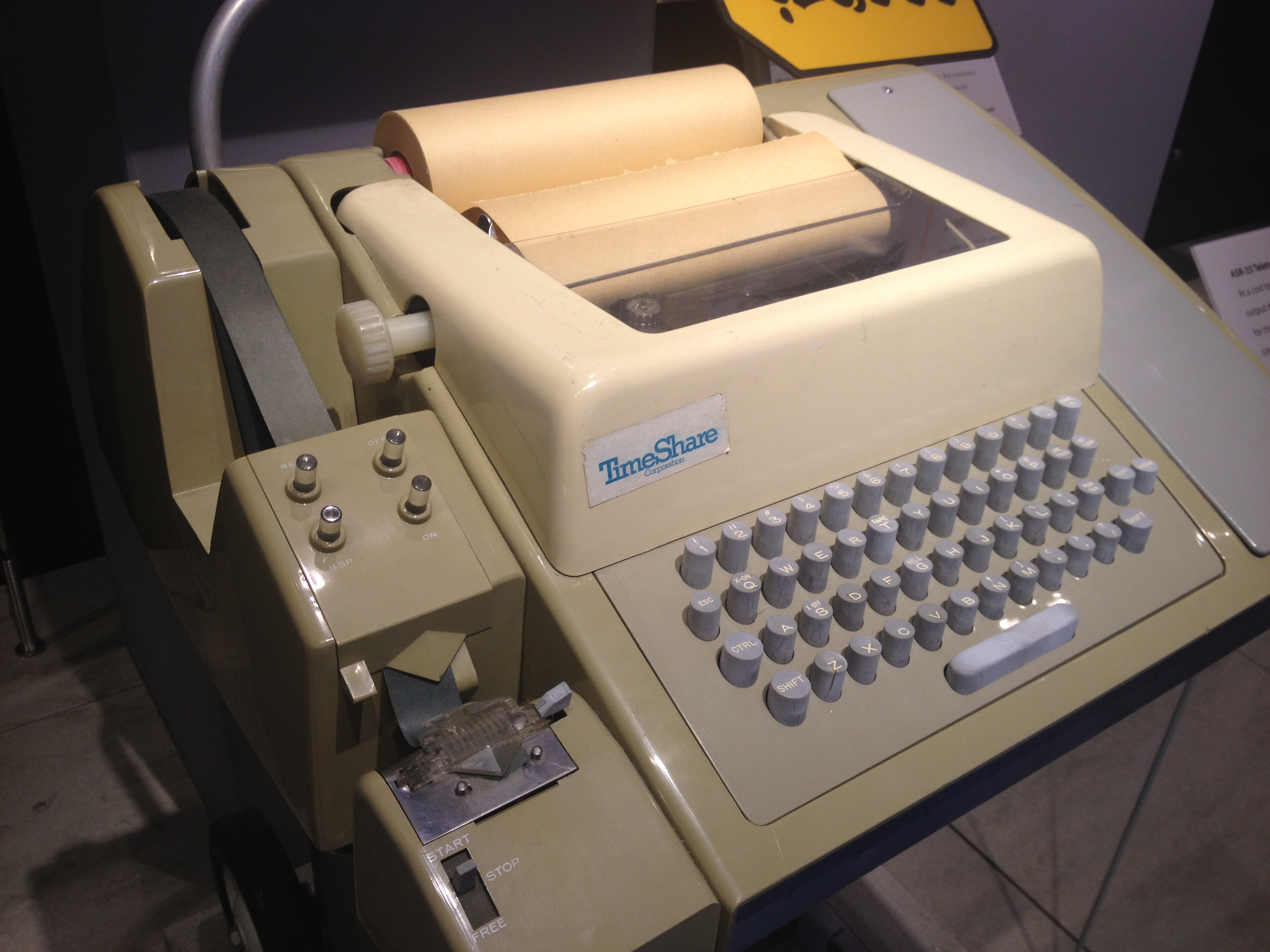
A Teletype Model 33 ASR teleprinter, with punched tape reader and punch, usable as a computer terminal

The Teletype Corporation, a part of American Telephone and Telegraph Company's Western Electric manufacturing arm since 1930, was founded in 1906 as the Morkrum Company. In 1925, a merger between Morkrum and Kleinschmidt Electric Company created the Morkrum-Kleinschmidt Company. The name was changed in December 1928 to Teletype Corporation. In 1930, Teletype Corporation was purchased by the American Telephone and Telegraph Company and became a subsidiary of Western Electric. In 1984, the divestiture of the Bell System resulted in the Teletype name and logo being replaced by the AT&T name and logo, eventually resulting in the brand being extinguished. The last vestiges of what had been the Teletype Corporation ceased in 1990, bringing to a close the dedicated teleprinter business. Despite its long-lasting trademark status, the word Teletype went into common generic usage in the news and telecommunications industries. Records of the United States Patent and Trademark Office indicate the trademark has expired and is considered dead.

Teletype machines tended to be large, heavy, and extremely robust, capable of running non-stop for months at a time if properly lubricated. The Model 15 stands out as one of a few machines that remained in production for many years. It was introduced in 1930 and remained in production until 1963, a total of 33 years of continuous production. Very few complex machines can match that record. The production run was stretched somewhat by World War II—the Model 28 was scheduled to replace the Model 15 in the mid-1940s, but Teletype built so many factories to produce the Model 15 during World War II, it was more economical to continue mass production of the Model 15. The Model 15, in its receive only, no keyboard, version was the classic "news Teletype" for decades.

- Model 15 = Baudot version, 45 Baud; optional tape punch and reader
- Model 28 = Baudot version, 45-50-56-75 Baud; optional tape punch and reader
- Model 32 = small lightweight machine (cheap production) 45-50-56-75 Baud; optional tape punch and reader
- Model 33 = same as Model 32 but for 8 level ASCII-plus-parity-bit, 72 char./line, used as computer terminal; optional tape punch and reader.
- Model 35 = same as Model 28 but for 8 level ASCII-plus-parity-bit, used as heavy-duty computer terminal; optional tape punch and reader
- Model 37 = improved version of the Model 35, higher speeds up to 150 Baud; optional tape punch and reader
- Model 38 = similar to Model 33, but for 132 char./line paper (14 inches wide), upper and lower case, and red/black printing; optional tape punch and reader
- Model 40 = new system processor based, w/ monitor screen, but mechanical "chain printer"
- Model 42 = new cheap production Baudot machine to replace Model 28 and Model 32, paper tape acc.
- Model 43 = same but for 8 level ASCII-plus-parity-bit, to replace Model 33 and Model 35, paper tape acc.

Several different high-speed printers like the "Ink-tronic" etc.

=== Texas Instruments ===
Texas Instruments developed its own line of teletypes in 1971, the Silent 700. Their name came from the use of a thermal printer head to emit copy, making them substantially quieter than contemporary teletypes using impact printing, and some such as the 1975 Model 745 and 1983 Model 707 were even small enough to be sold as portable units. Certain models came with acoustic couplers and some had internal storage, initially cassette tape in the 1973 Models 732/733 ASR and later bubble memory in the 1977 Models 763/765, the first and one of the few commercial products to use the technology. In these units their storage capability essentially acted as a form of punched tape. The last Silent 700 was the 1987 700/1200 BPS, which was sold into the early 1990s.

== Telex ==
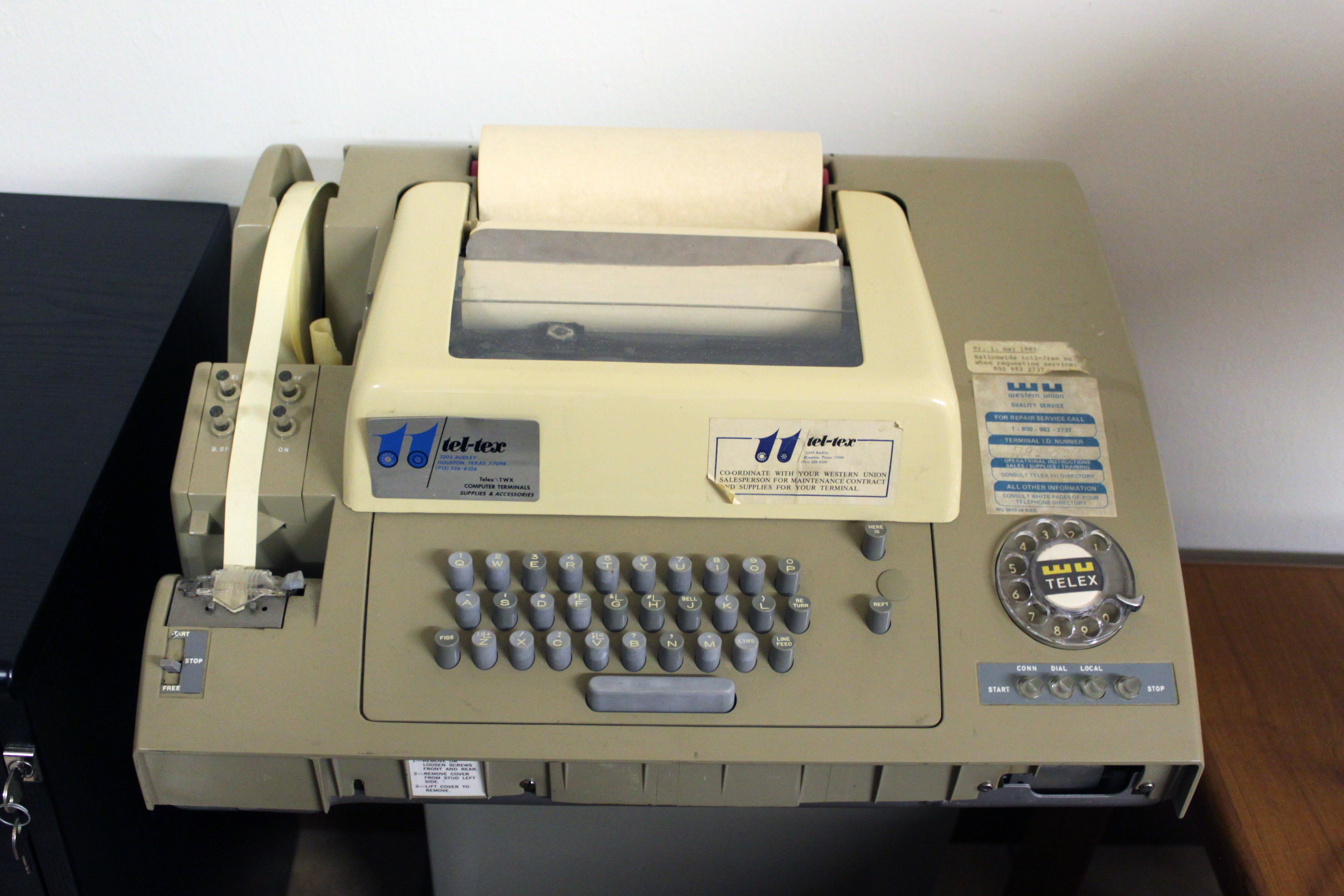
A Teletype Model 32 ASR used for Telex service

A global teleprinter network called Telex was developed in the late 1920s, and was used through most of the 20th century for business communications. The main difference from a standard teleprinter is that Telex includes a switched routing network, originally based on pulse-telephone dialing, which in the United States was provided by Western Union. AT&T developed a competing network called "TWX" which initially also used rotary dialing and Baudot code, carried to the customer premises as pulses of DC on a metallic copper pair. TWX later added a second ASCII-based service using Bell 103 type modems served over lines whose physical interface was identical to regular telephone lines. In many cases, the TWX service was provided by the same telephone central office that handled voice calls, using class of service to prevent POTS customers from connecting to TWX customers. Telex is still in use in some countries for certain applications such as shipping, news, weather reporting and military command. Many business applications have moved to the Internet as most countries have discontinued telex/TWX services.

== Teletypesetter ==
In addition to the 5-bit Baudot code and the much later seven-bit ASCII code, there was a six-bit code known as the Teletypesetter code (TTS) used by news wire services. It was first demonstrated in 1928 and began to see widespread use in the 1950s. Through the use of "shift in" and "shift out" codes, this six-bit code could represent a full set of upper and lower case characters, digits, symbols commonly used in newspapers; typesetting instructions such as "flush left" or "center"; and even "auxiliary font", to switch to italics or bold type, and back to roman ("upper rail").

The TTS produces aligned text, taking into consideration character widths and column width, or line length.

A Model 20 Teletype machine with a paper tape punch ("reperforator") was installed at subscriber newspaper sites. Originally these machines would simply punch paper tapes and these tapes could be read by a tape reader attached to a "Teletypesetter operating unit" installed on a Linotype machine. The "operating unit" was essentially a tape reader which actuated a mechanical box, which in turn operated the Linotype's keyboard and other controls, in response to the codes read from the tape, thus creating type for printing in newspapers and magazines.

This allowed higher production rates for the Linotype, and was used both locally, where the tape was first punched and then fed to the machine, as well as remotely, using tape transmitters and receivers.

Remote use played an essential role for distributing identical content, such as syndicated columns, news agency news, classified advertising, and more, to different publications across wide geographical areas.

In later years the incoming 6-bit current loop signal carrying the TTS code was connected to a minicomputer or mainframe for storage, editing, and eventual feed to a phototypesetting machine.

== Teleprinters in computing ==
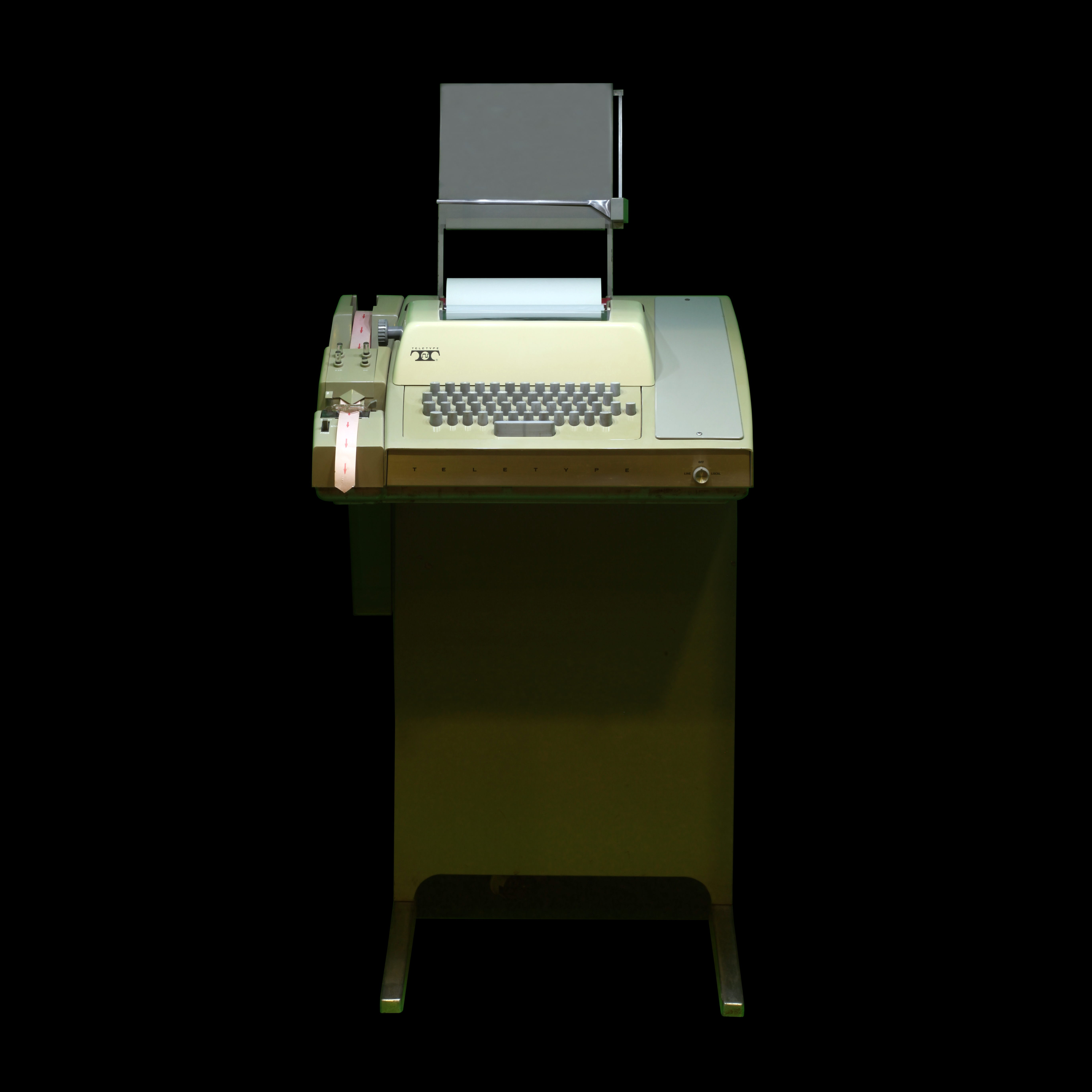
A Teletype Model 33 ASR with paper tape reader and punch, as used for early modem-based computing

Computers used teleprinters for input and output from the early days of computing. Punched card readers and fast printers replaced teleprinters for most purposes, but teleprinters continued to be used as interactive time-sharing terminals until video displays became widely available in the late 1970s.

Users typed commands after a prompt character was printed. Printing was unidirectional; if the user wanted to delete what had been typed, further characters were printed to indicate that previous text had been cancelled. When video displays first became available the user interface was initially exactly the same as for an electromechanical printer; expensive and scarce video terminals could be used interchangeably with teleprinters. This was the origin of the text terminal and the command-line interface.

Paper tape was sometimes used to prepare input for the computer session off line and to capture computer output. The popular Teletype Model 33 used 7-bit ASCII code (with an eighth parity bit) instead of Baudot. The common modem communications settings, Start/Stop Bits and Parity, stem from the ASCII era.

In early operating systems such as Digital's Monitor for the PDP-6 and PDP-10 (later called TOPS-10), serial communication lines were often connected to teleprinters and were given device names starting with tt. This and similar conventions were used in later operating systems from Digital and were adopted by many other operating systems. Unix and Unix-like operating systems use the prefix tty, for example /dev/tty13, or pty (for pseudo-tty), such as /dev/ptya0, but some of them (e.g., Solaris and recent Linux) have replaced pty files by a pts folder (where "pt" stands for "pseudoterminal" instead). In many computing contexts, "TTY" has become the name for any text terminal, such as an external console device, a user dialing into the system on a modem on a serial port device, a printing or graphical computer terminal on a computer's serial port or the RS-232 port on a USB-to-RS-232 converter attached to a computer's USB port, or even a terminal emulator application in the window system using a pseudoterminal device.

Teleprinters were also used to record fault printout and other information in some TXE telephone exchanges.

== Obsolescence of teleprinters ==
Although printing news, messages, and other text at a distance is still universal, the dedicated teleprinter tied to a pair of leased copper wires was made functionally obsolete by the fax, personal computer, inkjet printer, email, and the Internet.

In the 1980s, packet radio became the most common form of digital communications used in amateur radio. Soon, advanced multimode electronic interfaces such as the AEA PK-232 were developed, which could send and receive not only packet, but various other modulation types including Baudot. This made it possible for a home or laptop computer to replace teleprinters, saving money, complexity, space and the massive amount of paper which mechanical machines used.

== See also ==
- Letter-quality printer
- Plan 55-A, a message switching system for telegrams
- Radioteletype
- Siemens and Halske T52 – the Geheimfernschreiber (secrets teleprinter)
- Universal asynchronous receiver-transmitter, which made it easy to connect teleprinters and terminals emulating teleprinters to computers
