= Creed & Company =

British telecommunications company

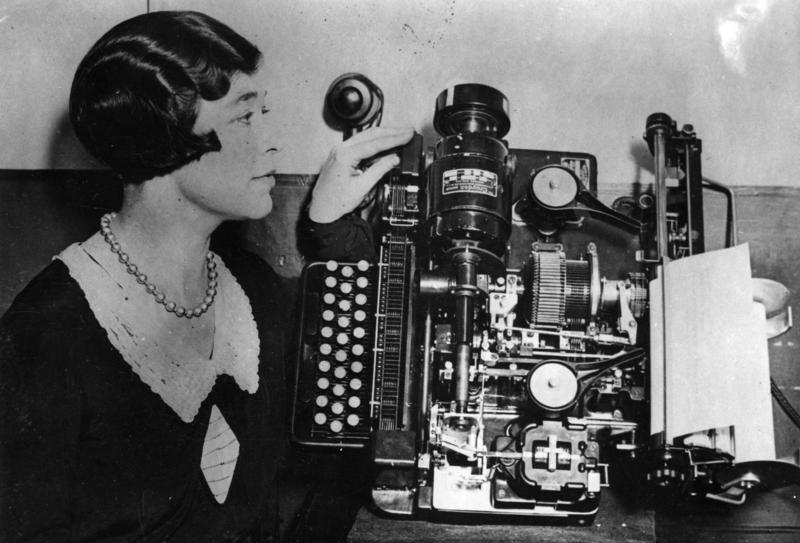
Creed Model 7 teleprinter

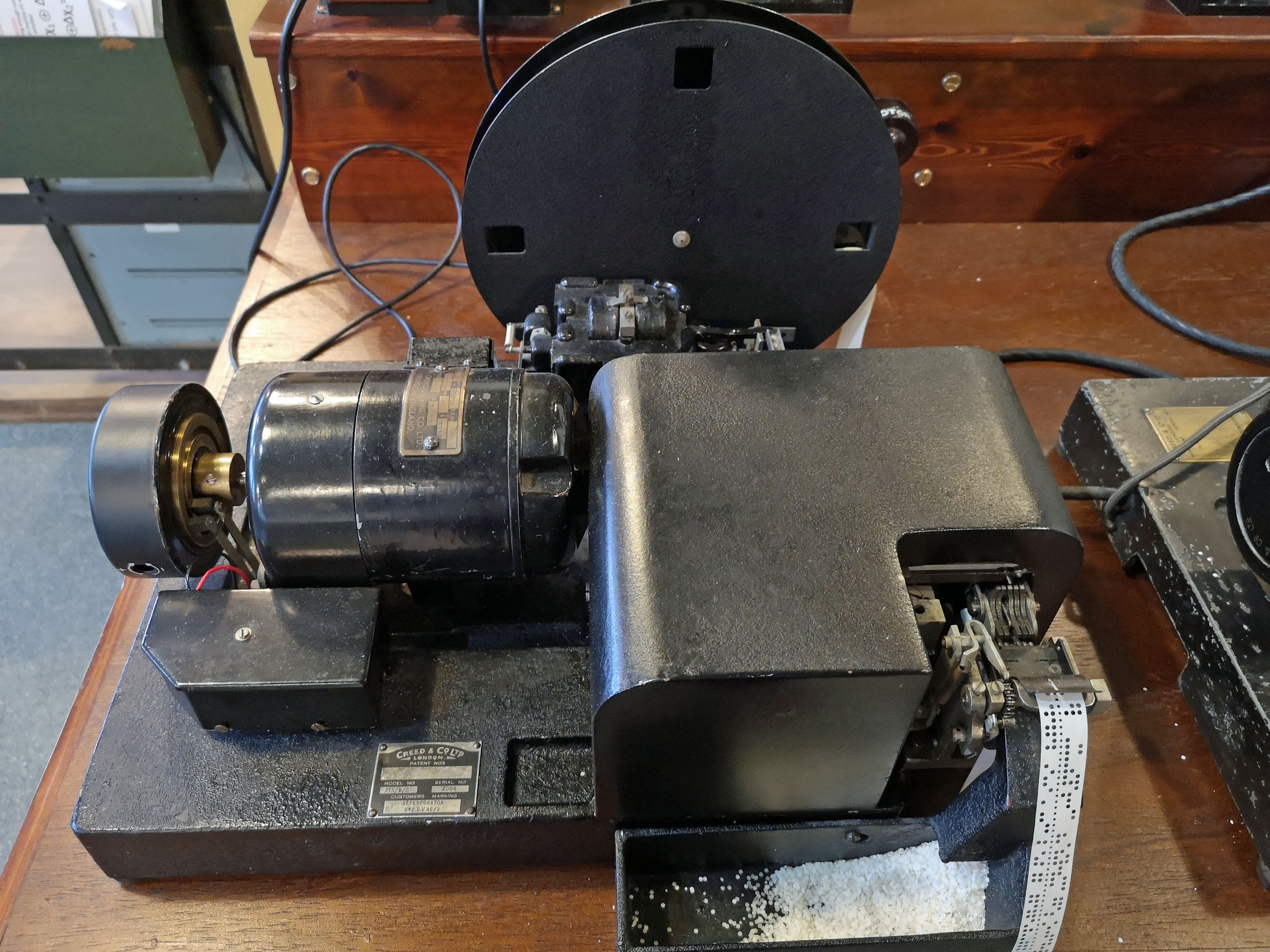
Creed model 7TR/B/2 receiving perforator (reperforator)

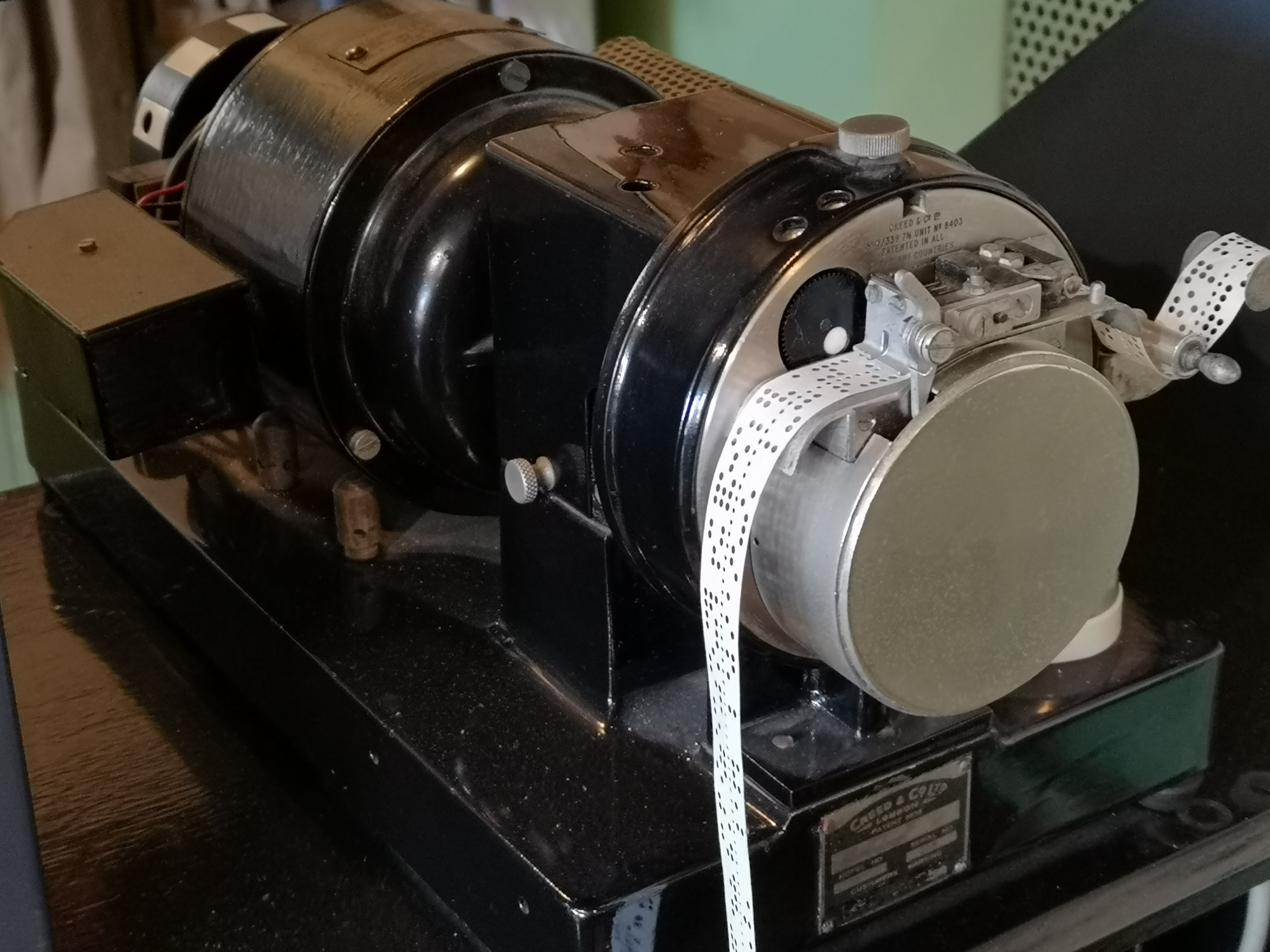
Creed model 6S/2 5-hole paper tape reader

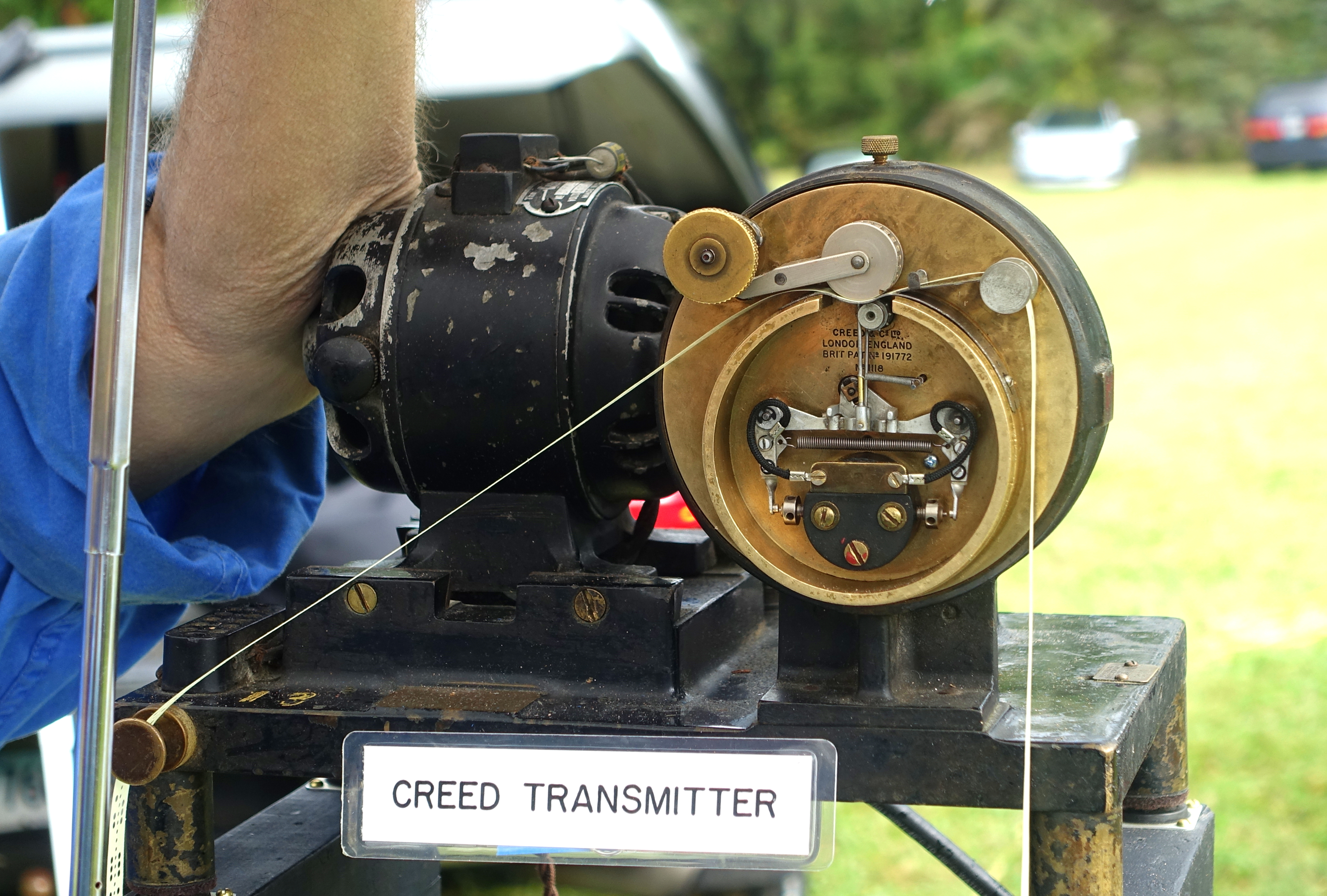
Creed & Company transmitter

Creed & Company was a British telecommunications company founded by Frederick George Creed which was an important pioneer in the field of teleprinter machines. It was merged into the International Telephone and Telegraph Corporation (ITT) in 1928.

== History ==
The company was founded by Frederick George Creed and Danish telegraph engineer Harald Bille, and was first incorporated in 1912 as "Creed, Bille & Company Limited". After Bille's death in a railway accident in 1916, his name was dropped from the company's title and it became simply Creed & Company.

The Company spent most of World War I producing high-quality instruments, manufacturing facilities for which were very limited at that time in the UK. Among the items produced were amplifiers, spark-gap transmitters, aircraft compasses, high-voltage generators, bomb release apparatus, and fuses for artillery shells and bombs.

In 1924 Creed entered the teleprinter field with their Model 1P, which was soon superseded by the improved Model 2P. In 1925 Creed acquired the patents for Donald Murray's Murray code, a rationalised Baudot code, and it was used for their new Model 3 Tape Teleprinter of 1927. This machine printed received messages directly onto gummed paper tape at a rate of 65 words per minute and was the first combined start-stop transmitter-receiver teleprinter from Creed to enter mass production.

Some of the key models were:

- Creed model 6S (punched paper tape reader)
- Creed model 7 (page printing teleprinter introduced in 1931)
- Creed model 7B (50 baud page printing teleprinter)
- Creed model 7E (page printing teleprinter with overlap cam and range finder)
- Creed model 7/TR (non-printing teleprinter reperforator)
- Creed model 54 (page printing teleprinter introduced in 1954)
- Creed model 75 (page printing teleprinter introduced in 1958)
- Creed model 85 (printing reperforator introduced in 1948)
- Creed model 86 (printing reperforator using 7/8" wide tape)
- Creed model 444 (page printing teleprinter introduced in 1966 - GPO type 15)

In July 1928, Creed & Company were merged into ITT.

During World War II Creed Company manufactured some of the British Typex machines, cipher devices similar to the German Enigma machine.
