= Donald Murray (inventor) =

New Zealand engineer

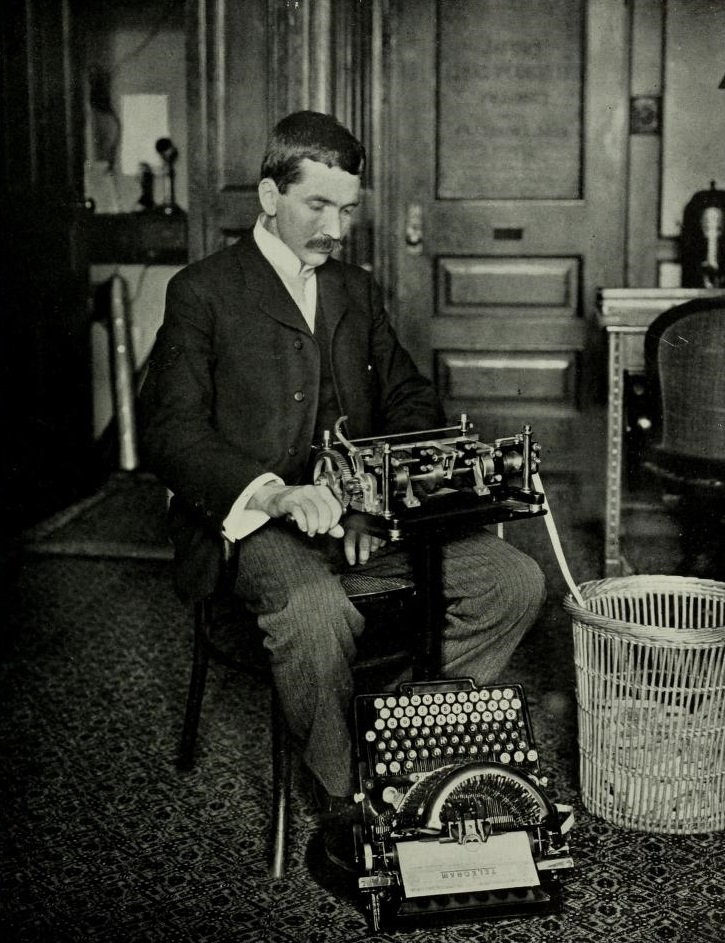
- Murray with Telegraphic Typewriter before 1901
- Born: 20 September 1865; Invercargill, New Zealand
- Died: 14 July 1945 (aged 79)
- Occupation: Electrical engineer
- Known for: Telegraphic typewriter

Donald Murray (20 September 1865 — 14 July 1945) was an electrical engineer and the inventor of a telegraphic typewriter system using an extended Baudot code that was a direct ancestor of the teleprinter (teletype machine). He can justifiably be called the "Father of the remote Typewriter".

Murray's system became the International Telegraph Alphabet No. 2 (ITA2) or Murray Code; it was supplanted by the American Standard Code for Information Interchange (ASCII) in 1963.

== Early life and education ==
Murray was born in Invercargill, New Zealand, in 1865, and was educated at the Lincoln Agricultural College near Christchurch from 1882. This led to his early work as a farmer.

Murray went to Europe in 1886, returning home in 1887 and working at The New Zealand Herald newspaper, while also studying at the Auckland University College from which he graduated in 1890 with a Bachelor of Arts. In 1891 he moved to Australia, where he worked for The Sydney Morning Herald newspaper while studying at the University of Sydney for a Master of Arts in logic.

== Telegraphic typewriter ==
It was during his time with the Sydney Morning Herald that Murray got the idea for the telegraphic typewriter. At the time, telegrams were transmitted by telegraphists using Morse code, then typed onto a telegram form which was then delivered by bicycle or on foot. Murray's idea was to use a typewriter to drive a device that translated each character of the text into a modified Baudot code. On the receiving end, another mechanism would print the coded characters on a paper tape, and/or make a perforated copy of the message. This system allowed the transmission of messages without need of operators trained in Morse code. At the time typists were being trained in great numbers using the QWERTY keyboard layout.

Murray went to New York City in 1899 with the idea for his invention, and sought backing while submitting a patent. The patent describes the teleprinter system. It received backing from the Postal Telegraph Cable Company, and was then manufactured. This formalized and heavily promoted the use of the QWERTY keyboard, to the detriment of other keyboard layouts.

The machines were introduced world-wide, with systems prominently at New York's Western Union and London's General Post Office.

Murray soon moved to London, and remained there until he sold the rights to his invention in 1925. He then retired to Monte Carlo and later Switzerland, where he studied and wrote on philosophy.

== Publications ==
Murray was the author of three books:

- The Philosophy of Power: First Principles, London: Williams & Norgate (1939).
- The Philosophy of Power, Volume 2: The Theory of Control, London: Williams & Norgate (1940).
- Australia: Poverty or Progress?, Melbourne: Henry George Foundation (1945).
