= Message switching =

Method for transmitting data over a telecommunications network

In telecommunications, message switching involves messages routed in their entirety, one hop at a time. It evolved from circuit switching and was the precursor of packet switching.

An example of message switching is email in which the message is sent through different intermediate servers to reach the mail server for storing. Unlike packet switching, the message is not divided into smaller units and sent independently over the network.

== History ==
Western Union operated a message switching system, Plan 55-A, for processing telegrams in the 1950s. Leonard Kleinrock wrote a doctoral thesis at the Massachusetts Institute of Technology in 1962 that analyzed queueing delays in this system.

Message switching was built by Collins Radio Company, Newport Beach, California, during the period 1959–1963 for sale to large airlines, banks and railroads.

The original design for the ARPANET was Wesley Clark's April 1967 proposal for using Interface Message Processors to create a message switching network. After the seminal meeting at the first ACM Symposium on Operating Systems Principles in October 1967, where Roger Scantlebury presented Donald Davies work and referenced the work of Paul Baran, Larry Roberts incorporated packet switching into the design.

The SITA High-Level Network (HLN) became operational in 1969, handling data traffic for airlines in real time via a message-switched network over common carrier leased lines. It was organised to act like a packet-switching network.

Message switching systems are nowadays mostly implemented over packet-switched or circuit-switched data networks. Each message is treated as a separate entity. Each message contains addressing information, and at each switch this information is read and the transfer path to the next switch is decided. Depending on network conditions, a conversation of several messages may not be transferred over the same path. Each message is stored (usually on hard drive due to RAM limitations) before being transmitted to the next switch. Because of this it is also known as a 'store and forward' network. Email is a common application for message switching because a delay in delivering email is acceptable.

== Examples ==
Hop-by-hop Telex forwarding and UUCP are examples of message switching systems.

When this form of switching is used, no physical path is established in advance between sender and receiver. Instead, when the sender has a block of data to be sent, it is stored in the first switching office (i.e. router) then forwarded later one hop at a time. Each block is received in its entity form, inspected for errors and then forwarded or re-transmitted.

A form of store-and-forward network. Data is transmitted into the network and stored in a switch. The network transfers the data from switch to switch when it is convenient to do so, as such the data is not transferred in real-time. Blocking can not occur, however, long delays can happen. The source and destination terminal need not be compatible, since conversions are done by the message switching networks.

A message switch is "transactional". It can store data or change its format and bit rate, then convert the data back to their original form or an entirely different form at the receive end. Message switching multiplexes data from different sources onto a common facility. A message switch is one of the switching technologies.

== Store and forward delays ==
Since message switching stores each message at intermediate nodes in its entirety before forwarding, messages experience an end to end delay which is dependent on the message length, and the number of intermediate nodes. Each additional intermediate node introduces a delay which is at minimum the value of the minimum transmission delay into or out of the node. Note that nodes could have different transmission delays for incoming messages and outgoing messages due to different technology used on the links. The transmission delays are in addition to any propagation delays which will be experienced along the message path.

In a message-switching centre an incoming message is not lost when the required outgoing route is busy. It is stored in a queue with any other messages for the same route and retransmitted when the required circuit becomes free. Message switching is thus an example of a delay system or a queuing system. Message switching is still used for telegraph traffic and a modified form of it, known as packet switching, is used extensively for data communications.

== Advantages ==
The advantages to message switching are:

- Data channels are shared among communication devices, improving the use of bandwidth.
- Messages can be stored temporarily at message switches, when network congestion becomes a problem.
- Priorities may be used to manage network traffic.
- Broadcast addressing uses bandwidth more efficiently because messages are delivered to multiple destinations.

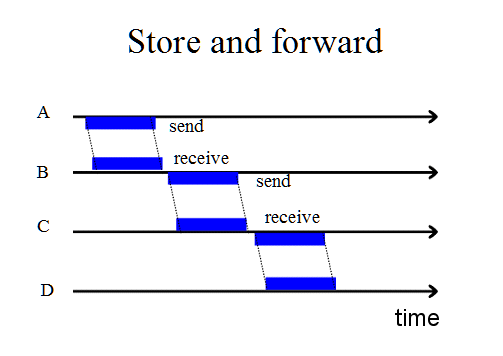
Store and forward delays

== See also ==
- SMS
- Circuit switching
- Message-oriented middleware
- Delay tolerant networking
