= Plan 55-A =

A small part of a Plan 55-A message switching center, showing paper tape punches and readers used for buffering.

Automatic Telegraph Switching System Plan 55-A was one in a series of store and forward message switching systems developed by Western Union and used from 1948 to 1976 for processing telegrams. It is an automated successor to Plan 51, which commenced service in 1951 in a nationwide network of the U.S. Air Force, but required semi-automatic operation.

Based on the technology of punched paper tape storage, the systems of the design were called reperforators. A reperforator performed functions similar to an email message transfer agent (email server), used much later in the Internet, but it used electro-mechanical technology, which preceded the use of semiconductor circuitry and computers.

== Operation ==
A reperforator switching center received messages via serial communication lines from teleprinters, such as the Teletype Model 28 ASR, or from other switching centers on receiving consoles, each consisting of a paper tape punch feeding tape into a paper tape reader via a storage bin. The reader decoded the message header, and sent the header characters to the director. The director, much like a telephone switch, connected the receiving console to a sending console in the same switching center by a cross-office connection. The message was transmitted from the receiving console to the sending console, character by character, punching a second paper tape at the sending console. Cross-office connections, and their readers and punches, were slightly faster than external connections, to limit congestion to the edges of the network.

Each sending console also consisted of a paper tape punch and reader. Output from each sending console was transmitted via outgoing lines to other switching centers or to destination teleprinters. Each message typically contained one telegram.

Each received message had up to nine routing indicators, or destinations. For two or three destinations, the messages were sent simultaneously on three cross-office connections to outgoing sending consoles. Additional destinations resulted in a copy of the message being sent to the multiple call spillover unit, which removed the routing indicators for destinations already handled and sent the message through the system again.

Nationwide, Western Union's switching centers were arranged in a hub and spokes architecture involving fifteen locations. The U.S. Air Force used the Plan 55-A system worldwide with ten centers.

== Queuing theory ==
An analysis of the queueing delays in Plan 55-A by Leonard Kleinrock formed part of his doctoral research in the early 1960s.

== See also ==
- Teleprinter
