= Teletype Corporation =

American teleprinter manufacturer

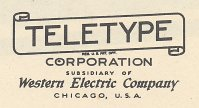
- Type: Manufacturing
- Industry: Communications
- Founded: 1928
- Headquarters: Chicago, Illinois, United States
- Products: Teleprinter equipment

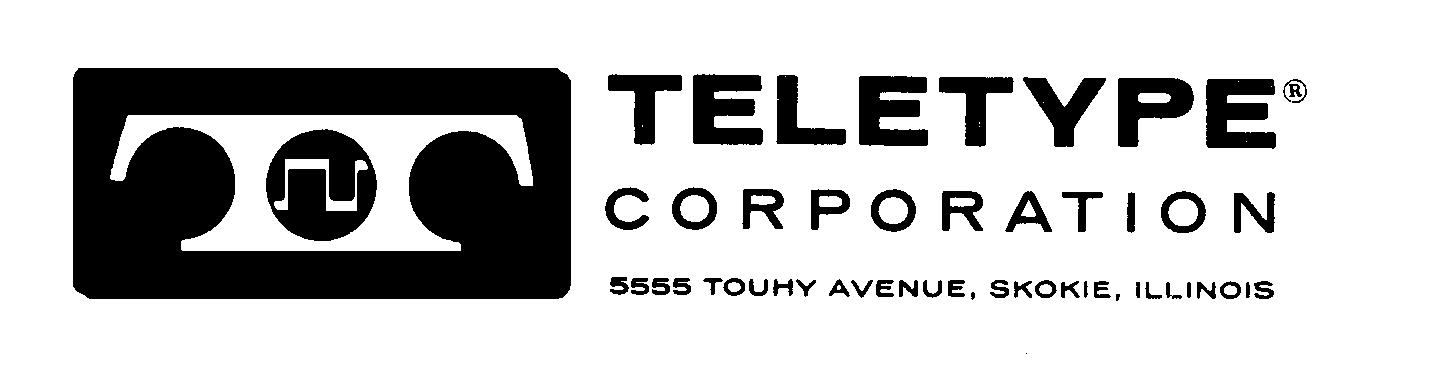

The Teletype Corporation was an American manufacturer of teleprinters and other data and record communications equipment. A part of American Telephone and Telegraph Company's Western Electric manufacturing arm from 1930, it came into being in 1928 when the Morkrum-Kleinschmidt Company changed its name to the name of its trademark equipment.

Unlike its parent, Western Electric, Teletype had customers outside the Bell System, which it served with its own sales force. Its primary external customer was the United States Government.

The Teletype Corporation continued in this manner until January 8, 1982, the date of settlement of United States v. AT&T, a 1974 United States Department of Justice antitrust suit against AT&T. At that time, Western Electric was fully absorbed into AT&T as AT&T Technologies, and the Teletype Corporation became AT&T Teletype. The last vestiges of what had been the Teletype Corporation ceased in 1990.

== History ==
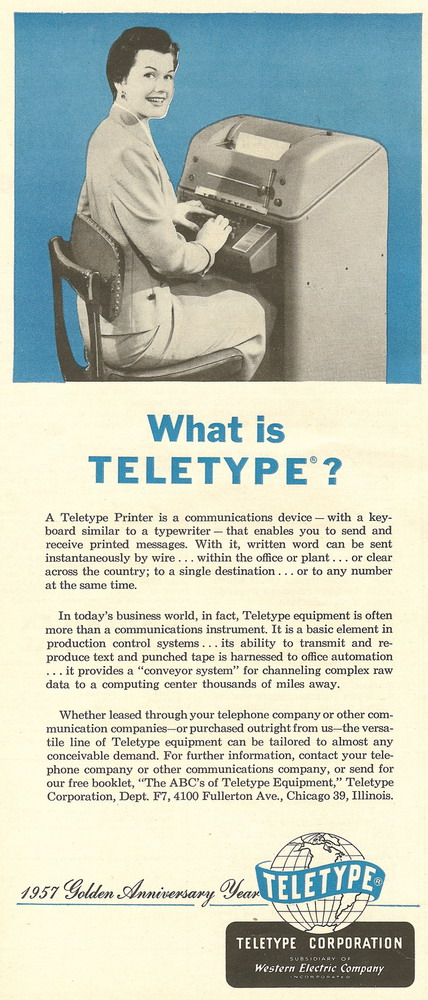
A Teletype Corporation advertisement from 1957.

The Teletype Corporation had its roots in the Morkrum Company. In 1902, electrical engineer Frank Pearne approached Joy Morton, head of Morton Salt, seeking a sponsor for Pearne's research into the practicalities of developing a printing telegraph system. Joy Morton needed to determine whether this was worthwhile and so consulted mechanical engineer Charles Krum, who was vice president of the Western Cold Storage Company, which was run by Morton’s brother Mark Morton. Krum was interested in helping Pearne, so space was set up in a laboratory in the attic of Western Cold Storage. Frank Pearne lost interest in the project after a year, and left to become a teacher at Armour Institute, now Illinois Institute of Technology. Krum was prepared to continue Pearne’s work, and in August 1903 a patent was filed for a "typebar page printer".

The present-day Pearne family disputes the claim that their ancestor lost interest, saying that Morton didn't pay him enough to support his family and that is why he left. It is perhaps noteworthy that many of the engineering staff of Teletype were educated at Armour/IIT, beginning with Howard Krum.

In 1904, Krum filed a patent for a "type wheel printing telegraph machine" which was issued in August 1907.

In 1906, the Morkrum Company was formed, with the company name combining the Morton and Krum names and reflecting the financial assistance provided by Joy Morton. This is the time when Charles Krum's son, Howard Krum, joined his father in this work. It was Howard who developed and patented the start-stop synchronizing method for code telegraph systems, which made possible the practical teleprinter.

In 1908, a working teleprinter was produced, called the Morkrum Printing Telegraph, which was field tested with the Alton Railroad.

In 1910, the Morkrum Company designed and installed the first commercial teletypewriter system on Postal Telegraph Company lines between Boston and New York City using the "Blue Code Version" of the Morkrum Printing Telegraph.

In 1925, the Morkrum Company and the Kleinschmidt Electric Company merged to form the Morkrum-Kleinschmidt Company.

In December 1928, the company changed its name to the less cumbersome "Teletype Corporation".

In 1930, the Teletype Corporation was purchased by the American Telephone and Telegraph Company for $30,000,000 in stock and became a subsidiary of the Western Electric Company. While some principals in the Teletype Corporation retired, Howard Krum stayed on as a consultant. Sterling Morton, who no doubt got his job as President of Teletype because of his family's investments in the company, became head of the family's salt business. Although he was not educated as an engineer he seems to have had quite an aptitude for invention, as evidenced by his name on several of the company's patents.

In 1974, the Teletype Corporation, being a Western Electric company subsidiary, went on strike with its 1400 International Brotherhood of Electrical Workers employee members at Little Rock over improved benefits, pay increases, and cost‐of‐living adjustments. A ratified contract was agreed on September 3, 1974 with other Western Electric plants to end the strike; however, the contract was subject to ratification at the Arkansas plant.

== Teleprinter equipment ==
=== Morkrum Company ===
- Morkrum Printing Telegraph – This was the first mechanically successful teleprinter, initially used to 1908 for the Alton Railroad trials. A "Blue Code Version" was used in 1910 as a part of the first commercial teleprinter circuit that ran on Postal Telegraph Company lines between Boston and New York City. In 1914, a "Green Code Version" was installed using Western Union Telegraph Company lines for the Associated Press and was used to distribute news to competing newspapers in New York City.
- Morkrum Model 11 Tape Printer – The Model 11 Typewheel Tape Printer, at about 45 words-per-minute, was a bit faster than the Morkrum Printing Telegraph Blue and Green-Code printers, and was modeled after the European Baudot Telegraph System printer. The Model 11 was a Tape Printer which used gummed paper tape that could be pasted onto a telegram blank. This was the first teleprinter to successfully operate from an airplane.
- Morkrum Model GPE Perforator – The Morkrum Company Model GPE "Green Code" Perforator was designed about 1913 and a US Patent was filed in 1914. This equipment continued to be produced for the next 50 years.
- Morkrum Model 12 Typebar Page Printer – This equipment, also known as the Model 12 Page Printer, based on an Underwood typewriter mechanism, was the first commercially viable machine. This printer was produced from 1922 to 1925 under the Morkrum Company name, from 1925 to 1929 under the Morkrum-Kleinschmidt name, and from 1929 to 1943 under Teletype Corp.

=== Kleinschmidt Electric Company ===
In 1916, Kleinschmidt filed a patent application for a type-bar page printer This printer utilized Baudot code but did not utilize the start-stop synchronization technology that Howard Krum had previously patented. The type-bar printer was intended for use on multiplex circuits, and its printing was controlled from a local segment on a receiving distributor of the sunflower type. In 1919, Kleinschmidt appeared to be concerned chiefly with development of multiplex transmitters for use with this printer. Kleinschmidt made his Kleinschmidt keyboard perforator which was later manufactured by Teletype.

=== Western Electric Company ===
- 10-A Printing Telegraph – The Western Electric Company made a line of printing telegraph equipment prior to acquiring the Teletype Corporation in 1930. The design for this equipment was provided by the Bell Telephone Laboratories and their predecessor, the W. E. Research and Development Department. One Western Electric product which was preserved is the 10-A Printer. It was electrically operated, being controlled by relays and powered by magnets. Its printing element was a small typewheel mounted on a vertical axis.

=== Morkrum-Kleinschmidt Company ===
- Model 14 (1925) – On December 23, 1924, Howard Krum and Sterling Morton filed an application on the type-bar tape printer which matured into Patent No. 1,745,633. The Model 14 was a family of devices, printing, reading or punching narrow tapes; Baudot code. About 60,000 were built.

=== Teletype Corporation ===
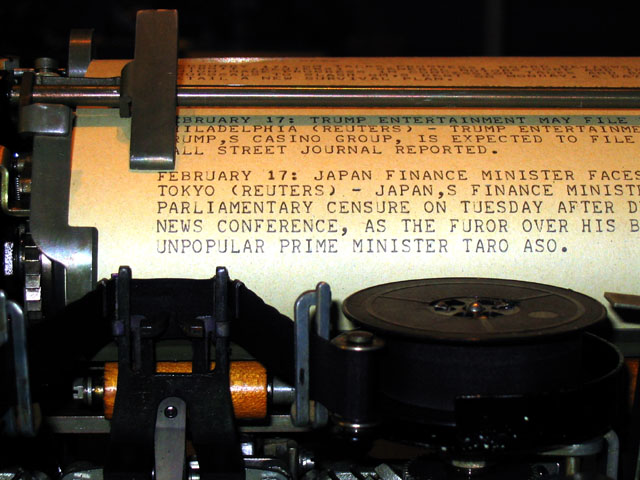
Model 15 Teletype printing a news report

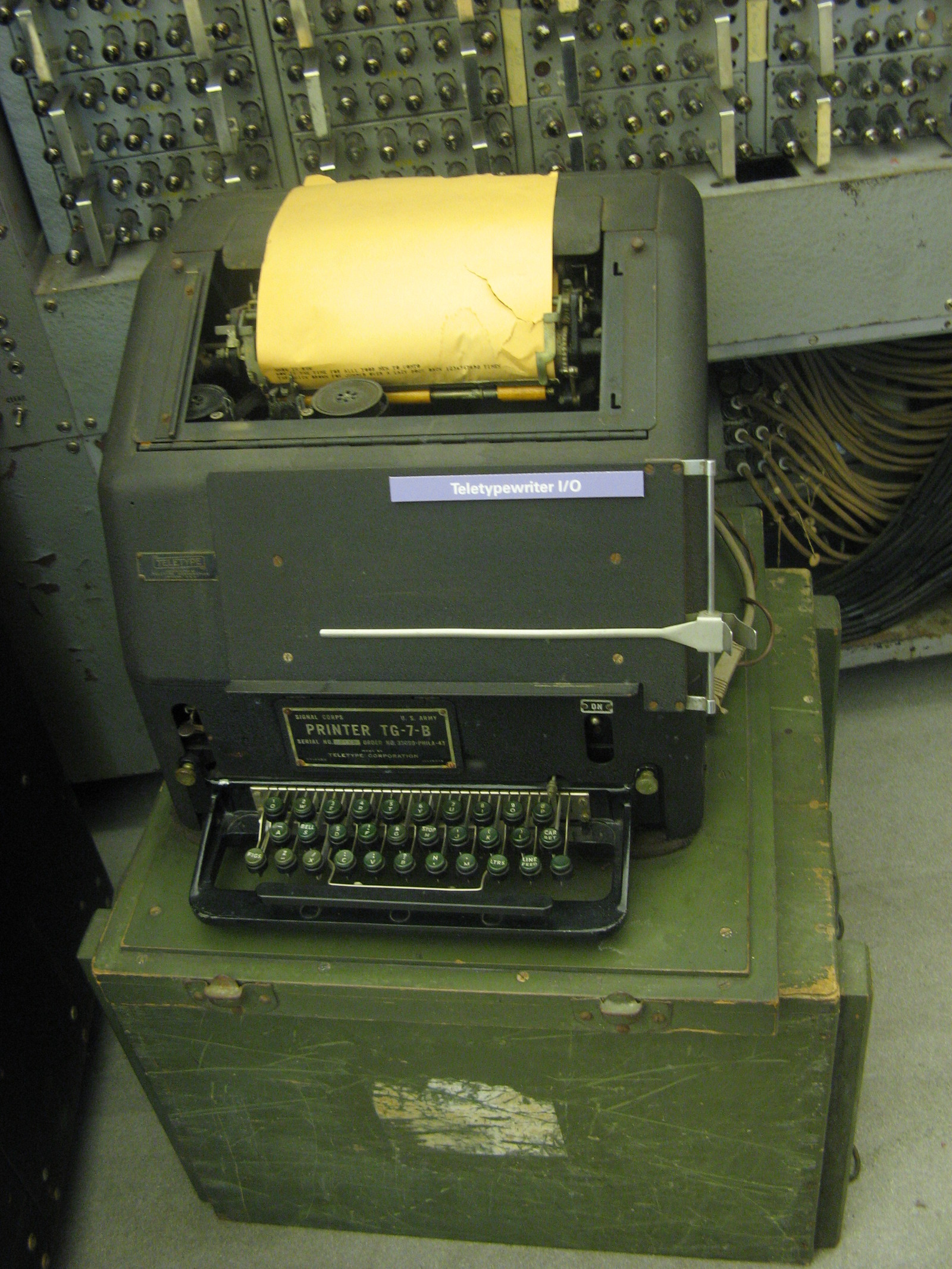
A military version of the Model 15

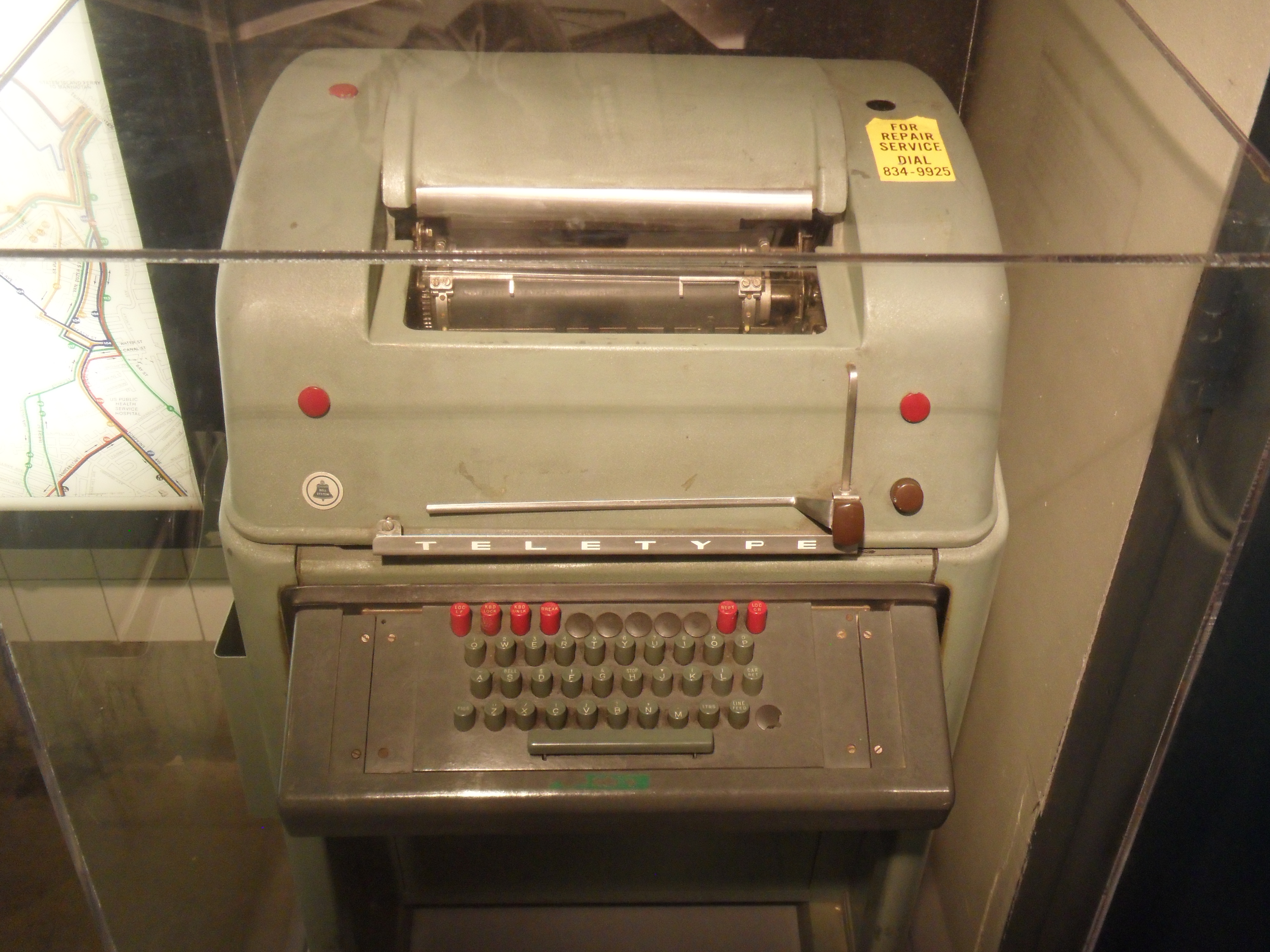
A Model 28 KSR

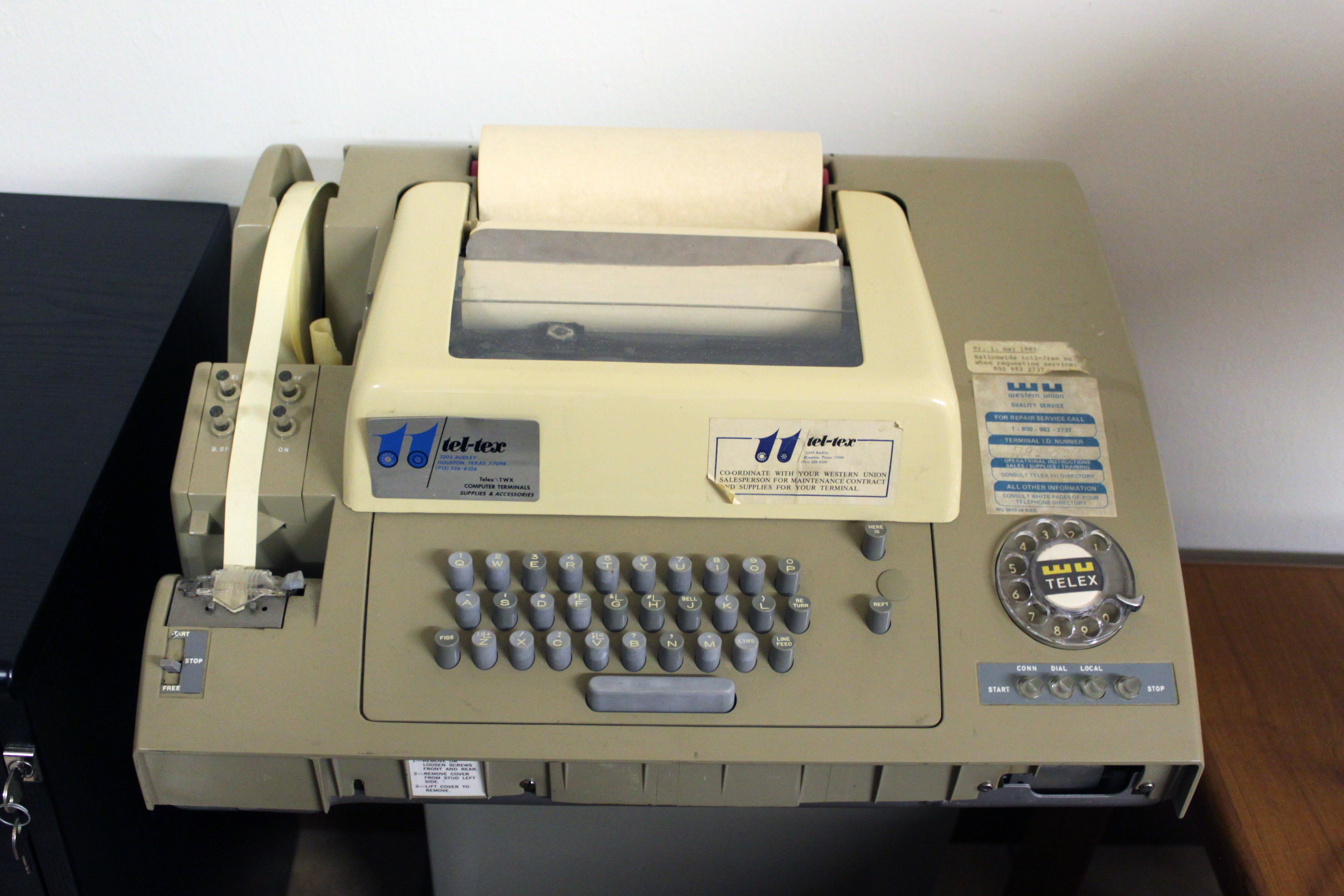
A Teletype Model 32 ASR Baudot (5-level) machine, as used on the Telex network.

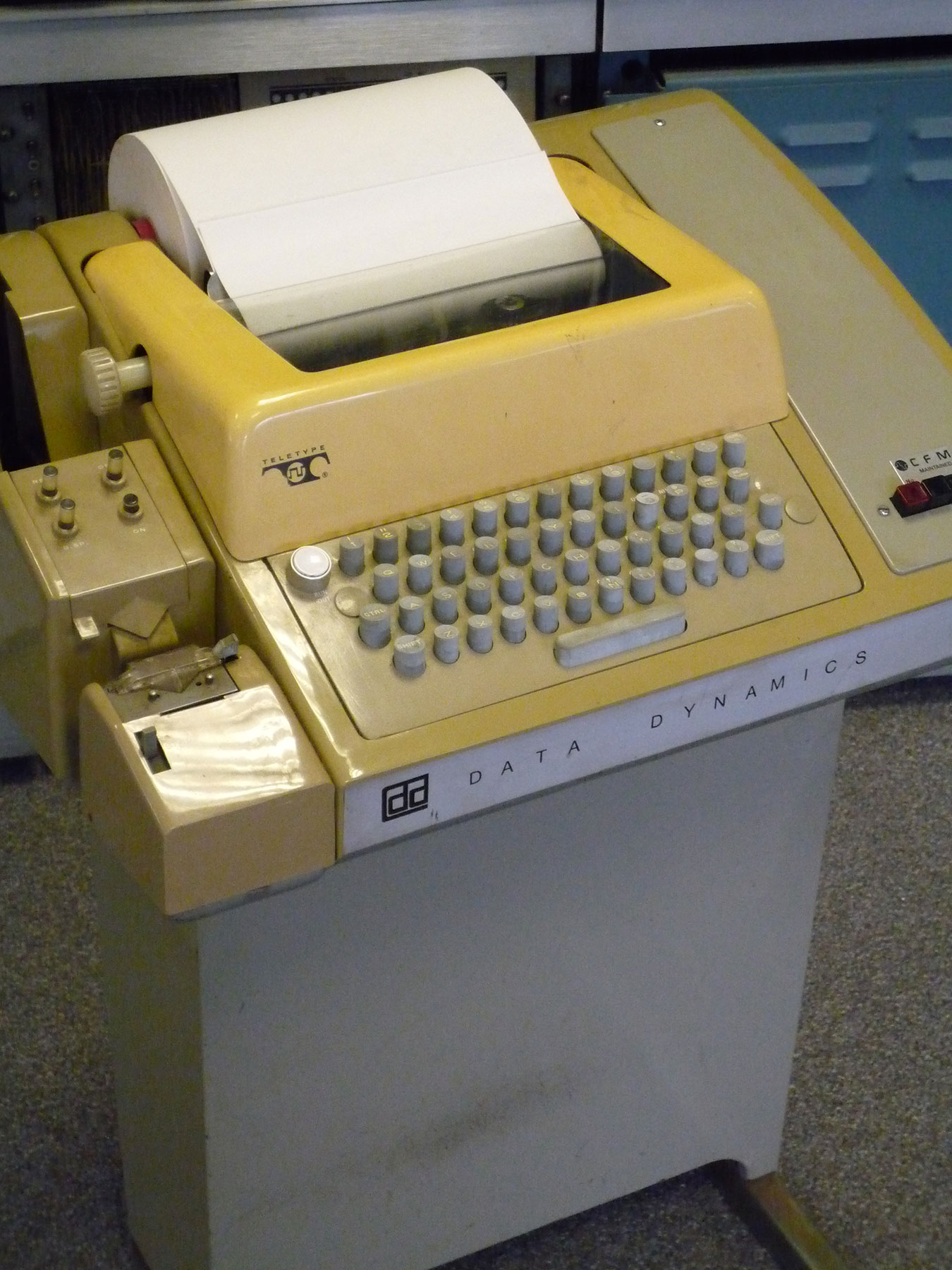
The Model 33 ASR was ubiquitous as an inexpensive input/output device in the minicomputer era.

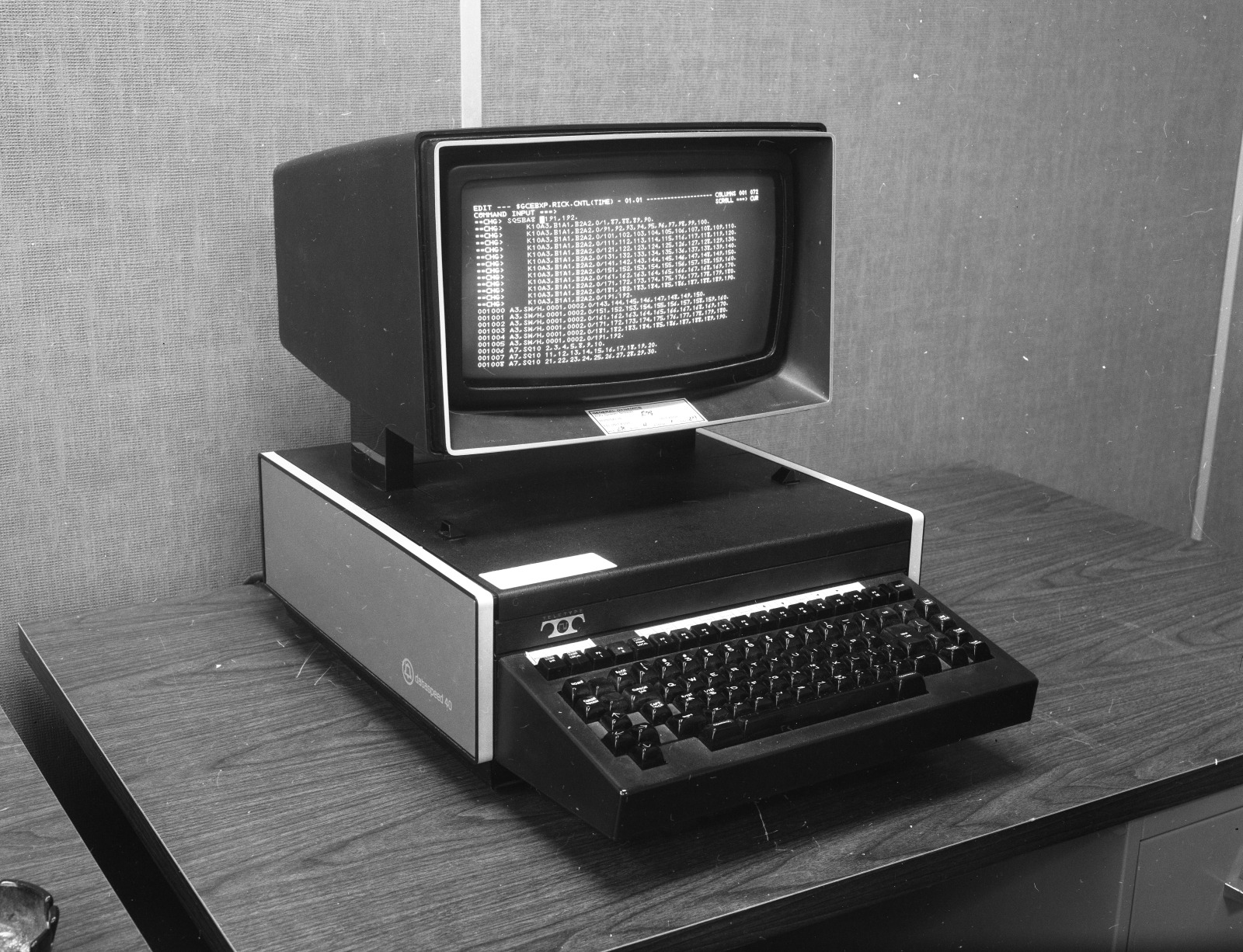
Dataspeed 40

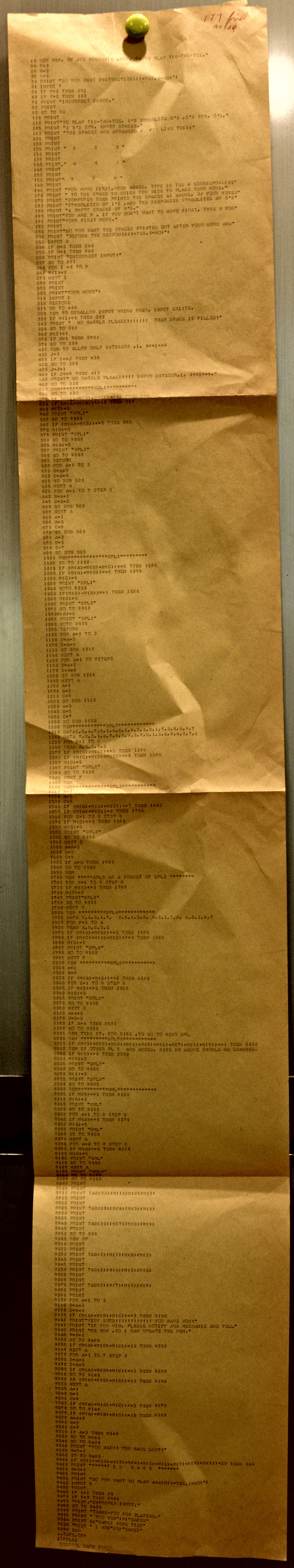
Paper output, a BASIC source code listing, from a Teletype Model 33 ASR in the mid 1970s. The Model 33 was commonly used to enter, edit, and interact with BASIC programs running on minicomputers.

Teletype models and their dates:

- Model 15 (1930)

The Teletype Model 15 is a Baudot code page printer; the mainstay of U.S. military communications in World War II. A reliable, heavy-duty machine with a cast frame. In 1930, Sterling Morton, Howard L. Krum, and Edward E. Kleinschmidt filed an application for a U.S. patent covering the commercial form of the Model 15 page printer. Approximately 200,000 Model 15 teleprinters were built. The Model 15 stands out as one of a few machines that remained in production for many years, remaining in production until 1963, a total of 33 years of continuous production. The production run was stretched somewhat by World War II — the Model 28 was scheduled to replace the Model 15 in the mid-1940s, but Teletype built so many factories to produce the Model 15 during World War II that it was more economical to continue mass production of the Model 15. The Model 15, especially in its "receive only" configuration with no keyboard, was the classic "news Teletype", at least until the 1950s, when the news wire services began to move to TeleTypeSetter feeds, but also long after that in places. Some radio stations used a recording of the sound of one of these machines as background during news broadcasts.

- Model 19 (1940)

The Teletype Model 19 is a Model 15 with an integrated paper tape perforator and a Model 14 Transmitter-Distributor.

- Model 20 (1940)

The Teletype Model 20 is an upper/lower case Type Bar Page Printer available as a receive only machine or a send-receive machine with four rows of keys, using a six-bit code for TeleTypeSetter (TTS) use.

- Model 26 (1939)

The Teletype Model 26 is a Baudot code page printer; a lower-cost machine using a typewheel. The platen and paper moved while typing, like a manual typewriter.

- Model 28 (1951)

The Teletype Model 28 is a product line of page printers, typing and non-typing tape perforator and tape reperforators, fixed-head single contact and pivoted head multi-contact transmitter-distributors, and receiving selector equipment. Regarded as the most rugged machines that the Teletype Corporation built, this line of teleprinters used an exchangeable type box for printing, and a sequential selector "Stunt Box" to mechanically initiate non-printing functions within the typing unit of the page printer, electrically control functions within the page printer and electrically control external equipment. The Teletype Corporation introduced the Model 28 as a commercial product in 1953, after this product had originally been designed for the US Military.

Starting with the Model 28, Teletype page printer model numbers were often modified by letters indicating the configuration. The configurations, in increasing order of equipment level and cost, were:

- RO – Receive Only, with a printer and no keyboard or built-in paper tape reader or punch
- KSR – Keyboard Send and Receive, with a keyboard and printer, but no built-in paper tape reader or punch
- ASR – Automatic Send and Receive, with a keyboard, printer, and built-in paper tape reader and punch

Not all models came in all three configurations. Teletype Corporation documents suffixed the configuration to the model number, e.g., "Model 33 ASR" (Model 33 Automatic Send and Receive). In contrast, some customers and users tended to place the configuration before the model number, e.g., "ASR-33".

The U.S. military had their own system of identifying the various models, often identifying various improvements, included options / features, etc. The TT-47/UG was the first Model 28 KSR, and while Teletype's designation for the basic machine remained the same over the next 20+ years, the TT-47/UG took on suffixes to identify the specific version. The last TT-47/UG was the TT-47L/UG. The U.S. Navy also assigned some "set" designations using the standard Army/Navy system, such as the AN/UGC-5, a Teletype Model 28 ASR which has a keyboard, printer, tape punch and reader facilities all in one cabinet.

- Model 29 (1950s)

The Teletype Model 29 is a six-bit machine using an IBM BCD code. It began as a replacement for Model 20, but apparently there was no market for such a machine, so it was repurposed for IDP (Integrated Data Processing) use.

- Model 31 (1947)

The Teletype Model 31 is a compact and light-weight five-level start-stop tape printer designed for mobile operation in the air and on the sea.

- Dataspeed systems (1962 and later)

Dataspeed was the Bell System name for a family of high speed paper tape systems used with DataPhone modems. Type 1 was 5-level, 1050 wpm. Type 2 was 5-8 level, 1050 wpm. Type 4 was 8 level with automatic error detection and correction by retransmitting blocks of data received in error. Type 5 was 8 level 750 wpm using a modem that was very inexpensive as a transmitter; hence the system was popular for data collection applications.

- Models 32/33 (1963)

The Teletype Model 32 and Teletype Model 33 are low-cost teleprinters, all-mechanical in design, with many plastic parts; both used a typewheel for printing. They were produced in ASR, KSR and RO versions and introduced as a commercial product in 1963 after being originally designed for the US Navy. The Model 33 is an ASCII teleprinter designed for light-duty office use. The Model 32 is a Baudot variant of the Model 33. Both were less rugged and less expensive than earlier Teletype machines. The Model 33 ASR was ubiquitous as a console device, with its paper tape reader/punch used as an I/O device, in the early minicomputer era. Over 600,000 Model 32 and 33 machines were manufactured.

- Model 35 (1963)

The Teletype Model 35 is a 110 baud terminal that utilizes a serial input/output eight-level 11 unit code signal consisting of a start bit, seven information bits, an even parity bit and two stop bits. The Model 35 was produced in ASR, KSR and RO versions. The Model 35 handles 1963 and USASI X3.4-1968 ASCII Code and prints 63 graphics of this code with letters in upper case on an 8.5 wide inch page using a typebox. The Model 35 interface will accept DC current (20 ma or 60 ma). An optional modem interface provides for operation over voice-grade channels. The modem transmits asynchronously in serial format, compatible with Bell System 101, 103 and 113 data sets or their equivalent.

The Teletype Model 35 ASR is 38.5 inches high, 40 inches wide and 24 inches deep. The Teletype Model 35 KSR and RO are 38.5 inches high, 24 inches wide and 24 inches deep. This machine uses a standard 115 VAC 60 Hz single phase synchronous motor. The recommended operating environment is a temperature of 40 to 110 Fahrenheit, a relative humidity of 2 to 95 percent and an altitude of 0 to 10,000 feet. Lubrication maintenance is recommended every 1500 hours of operation or every six months, whichever occurs first. The printing paper is an 8.44 inch by 4.5 inch diameter roll. Ribbons are 0.5 inch wide by 60 yards long, with plastic spools and eyelets for proper ribbon reverse operation.

Each 1ESS switch included a retractable rack-mounted 35-type TTY and a duplicate remote TTY.

- Inktronic Terminal (1966)

The Teletype Inktronic Terminal is an electronic, high-speed teleprinter that uses electrostatic deflection to print characters at 1200 words-per-minute. The Inktronic terminal prints an 80 column page using forty jets to print 63 alphanumeric characters in two columns on an 8.5 inch roll of paper. The Inktronic terminal was produced in KSR and RO versions. The KSR version can generate 128 ASCII code combinations while the RO version was available as a Baudot or ASCII printer. An ASR version was planned but not produced. When the Inktronic terminal proved unreliable and difficult to maintain, it was withdrawn from production.

- Model 37 (1969)

The Teletype Model 37 is a 150 baud terminal that utilizes a serial input/output 10 unit code signal consisting of a start bit, seven information bits, an even parity bit and a stop bit. The Model 37 was produced in ASR, KSR and RO versions. The Model 37 handles USASI X3.4-1968 ASCII Code and prints 94 graphics of this code with letters in both upper and lower case, with the option to print in two colors. The Model 37 uses a six-row removable typebox with provisions for 96 type pallet positions. When the Shift-Out feature is included, the six-row typebox is replaced with a seven-row typebox allowing 112 pallet positions, or it can be replaced with an eight-row typebox allowing 128 type pallet positions. The Model 37 interface meets the requirements of EIA RS-232-B. The Model 37 has a recommended maintenance interval of every six months or every 1500 hours. The Model 37 is 36.25 inches high. The Model 37 ASR and KSR are 27.5 inches deep. The Model 37 RO is 24.25 inches deep. The Model 37 ASR weighs 340 pounds. The Model 37 KSR and RO weighs approximately 185 pounds.

- 4100 Paper Tape Equipment (1972)

The 4100 Paper Tape Equipment consists of the 4110 series of synchronous paper tape readers (CX), 4120 series of synchronous punches (BRPE), 4130 series of asynchronous readers (DX) and the 4140 series of asynchronous punches (DRPE).

The CX readers operate at 107 characters per second, with two fixed-level versions for reading either 6-level or 8-level fully punched or chadless paper tape, and an adjustable-level version for reading 5, 6, 7 or 8-level paper tape. All CX version readers were packaged for table-top use and have a parallel contact interface which is wired directly to the reader tape sensing contacts.

The BRPE tape punches operate at 110 characters per second, with two adjustable-level versions for reading either 5 or 8-level paper tape or 6, 7 or 8-level paper tape. A fixed-level 6-level paper tape punch was also available. All BRPE version paper tape punches were packaged for table-top use and have a parallel contact interface which is wired directly to the punch electromagnetic coils.

The DX paper tape readers operate at any speed up to 360 characters per second via external timing, except EIA. EIA tape readers operate at 120 characters per second if internal timing is used, and up to 314 characters per second if external timing is used. All of the DX paper tape readers are adjustable-level, reading 5, 6, 7 or 8-level fully punched or chadless paper tape. The DX series of paper tape readers were available in table-top and rack mount models, with an optional verifier data output for use by an external verifier logic to guarantee the accuracy of each character read.

The DRPE tape punches operate at any speed up to 240 characters per second with an adjustable-level version for reading 6, 7 or 8-level paper tape and a fixed-level 6-level version. All DRPE version paper tape punches were packaged in table-top and rack-mount models, with an optional verifier logic which read each character immediately after it was punched, compared it to the character received and provided an error output pulse if they did not agree.

- Model 38 (1972)

The Teletype Model 38 is a 110 baud terminal that utilizes a serial input/output 11 unit code signal consisting of a start bit, seven information bits, an even parity bit and two stop bits. The Model 38 was produced in ASR, KSR and RO versions. The Model 38 handles USASI X3.4-1968 ASCII Code and prints 94 graphics of this code with letters in both upper and lower case, with the option to print in two colors on a pin-fed, 14-7/8 inch wide page. The Model 38 interface will accept either DC current (20 ma or 60 ma) or EIA RS-232-C. The Model 38 is a "stretched" version of the Model 33 with the additional components needed to print the full ASCII printable character set. As it used the Model 33 design, unchanged except for a wider print line, the design was not as reliable as the 33, due to flexing of the longer codebars and carriage power bail. An optional built-in modem interface provides for operation over voice-grade channels. The modem transmits asynchronously in serial format, compatible with Bell System 101, 103, 108 and 113 data sets or their equivalent.

- Models 42/43 (1977)

The Teletype Model 42 and Teletype Model 43 are electronic teleprinters providing character-at-a-time keyboard-printer send receive operation. The Teletype Model 42 is the Baudot variant of the Model 43, which is an ASCII teleprinter. The Model 43 has two transmission speeds, 100 words-per-minute and 300 words-per-minute, selectable by the operator to match the distant station speed. The Teletype Model 43 printer could print up to 80 characters per line using the friction feed printer option. Model 43 sprocket feed printers print messages with up to 132 characters per line using 12 inch wide sprocket feed paper. The tractor feed printer will print messages with up to 80 characters per line using 12 inch sprocket feed paper.

- Dataspeed 40 (1979)

The Teletype Dataspeed 40 combined electronic CRTs and high speed printer terminals and were networked in many different applications through the use of "cluster controllers" and digital data service units. The Dataspeed 40 interfaced a synchronous modem usually running at 2400, 4800 or 9600 baud. The trademarked term "Dataspeed" originated with a series of high speed paper tape terminals that sent and received oil-treated punched paper tape at 1050 words per minute. AT&T used the Dataspeed 40 terminals internally for their Switching Control Center System and similar purposes. The Dataspeed 40 was also sold commercially and used for a variety of purposes and displaced some older and slower speed Teletype equipment.

- Special Products and Systems
  - AN/FGC-5: electronic four-channel time-division multiplex system, using vacuum tube technology.
  - AN/UGC-1: transistorized four-channel multiplexer
  - AN/UGC-3: sixteen-channel multiplexer
  - ADIS: automatic data interchange system for the Federal Aviation Agency, handling weather data
  - BDIS: an automatic switching system for the F.A.A., handling flight plan data
  - AIDS: a similar data switching system for New York Telephone Co.
