= Charles L. Krum =

Charles Lyon Krum (1851/2 – September 25, 1937) was a key figure in the development of the teleprinter, a machine which played a key role in the history of telegraphy and computing.

In 1902, electrical engineer Mr. Frank Pearne approached Mr. Joy Morton, head of Morton Salt, seeking a sponsor for Pearne's research into the practicalities of developing a printing telegraph system. Joy Morton needed to determine whether this was worthwhile and so consulted renowned mechanical engineer Charles Krum, who was vice president of the Western Cold Storage Company (which was run by Morton’s brother Mark Morton).

Krum gave Joy Morton a positive response to the idea of helping Pearne, so space to set up a laboratory in the attic of Western Cold Storage was provided to Pearne. Pearne, after about a year of unsuccessful experiments, lost interest and left to get involved in teaching.

Krum was prepared to continue Pearne’s work, and in August, 1903 a patent was filed for a ‘typebar page printer’ (U.S. patent 888,335 issued in May, 1908).

In the following year, 1904 Krum filed a patent for a ‘type wheel printing telegraph machine’ U.S. patent 862,402 which was issued in August, 1907.

In 1906 Charles Krum's son, Howard Krum, graduated in electrical engineering and joined his father in this work. It was Howard who developed the start-stop synchronizing method for code telegraph systems, which made possible the practical teleprinter. This was recognized in U.S. patent 1,286,351 filed in May, 1910, and issued in December, 1918.

Charles Krum died on September 25, 1937 of a heart attack.
