= List of DuPont historic sites along Delaware Route 141 =

Coordinates: 39.77074°N 75.57761°W

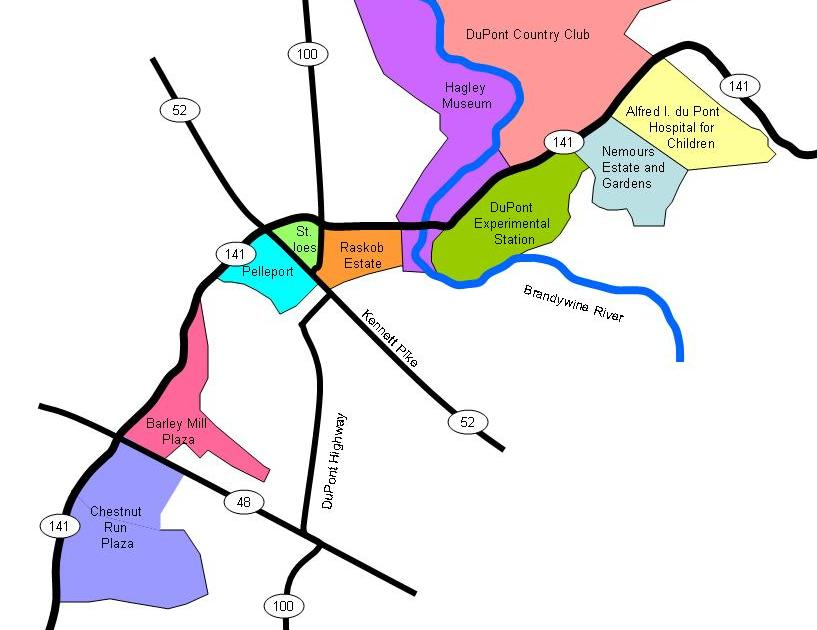
Map of the history of the DuPont family and company along Delaware Route 141

Along Delaware Route 141 there are a number of historic sites that trace the history of both the Du Pont family and the DuPont company. At the southwest end is DuPont’s Chestnut Run Plaza and at the northeastern end is the Alfred I. duPont Hospital for Children. Between are a number of sites on the National Register of Historic Places.

The historic locations include equal portion of the history of the American chemical industry, the role of the DuPont family - their estates and gardens - and the philanthropy of a distinguished American family.

== Chestnut Run Plaza ==
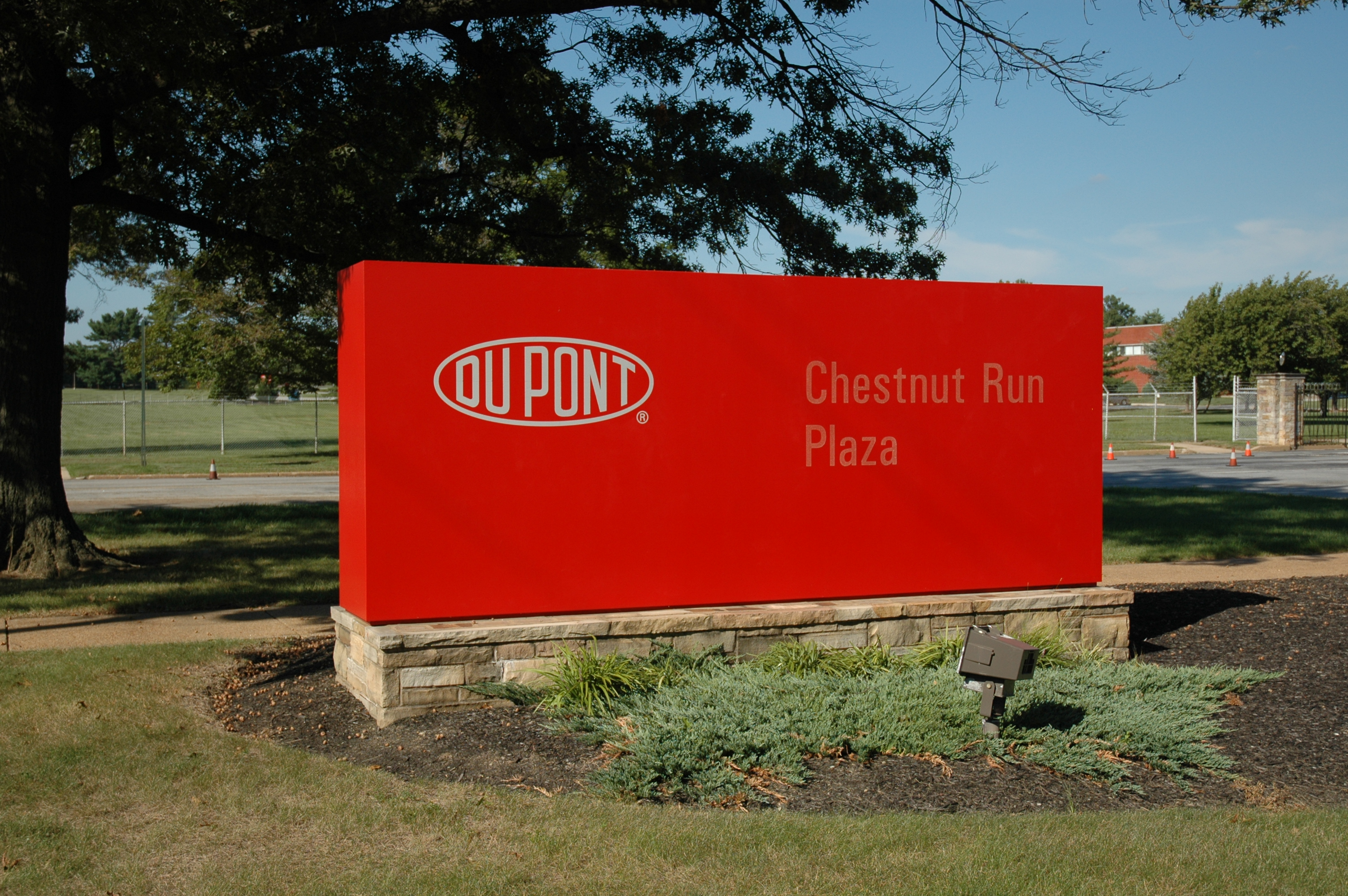
Entrance to Chestnut Run Plaza from Delaware Route 141

DuPont Chestnut Run Plaza is a 240-acre (0.97 km^{2}) research facility located on the northeast corner of Center and Faulkland Roads in Wilmington, Delaware. Construction started in 1952. It is a multi-business research facility dedicated to applied technology and customer service. It consists of nineteen buildings. DuPont business currently operating at the facility carry out research on fibers, imaging and printing, agrochemicals, polymers, and most recently hydrogen fuel-cells. Chestnut Run Plaza is a Certified Wildlife Habitat Council Site.

== DuPont Airport ==
The current Barley Mill Plaza was originally the site of the DuPont Airport. DuPont owned and operated the private airfield from 1924 until 1958. Charles Lindbergh’s “Spirit of St. Louis” made a landing there in 1927. Two du Pont family brothers Richard C. du Pont and Alexis Felix du Pont, Jr. purchased control of the All American Aviation Company in 1937 to obtain air mail technology which was further developed at the airfield. They grew that company to be Allegheny Airlines which is now known as US Airways.

The airport property was sold and then developed by Pearce Crompton as a multi-use office site. It was leased largely by the DuPont Company and eventually purchased by DuPont. It served as home for the management of many DuPont business units and DuPont's Legal Department. It was sold to a local developer and in 2010 it is currently the subject of a contentious rezoning dispute. Barley Mill Plaza is a Certified Wildlife Habitat Council Site.

== Pelleport ==
This site was once held the private home of William du Pont. Built in the late 1800s, Pelleport was named after one of the family's ancestral homes in France. Pelleport passed to cousin, Eugene du Pont Sr. whose family occupied the property for 2 generations. The residence stood vacant for over 25 years until it was razed in 1954 to make room for the Eugene du Pont Convalescent Memorial Hospital.

Christiana Care's Eugene du Pont Preventive Medicine & Rehabilitation Institute at Pelleport offers a range of programs designed to promote health, prevent disease and minimize disability.

== Delaware Route 52 ==
Delaware Route 52, also known as Kennett Pike, runs between Wilmington, Delaware and Pennsylvania where it merges into U.S. Route 1 near Longwood Gardens. It was built as a toll road between the years 1811 and 1813 at a cost of $30,000. The construction was authorized by a charter from the Delaware government issued to Christiana Hundred. In 1919, Pierre S. du Pont bought the road and discontinued toll collection. Dupont paved the road following the purchase and thus it is referred to as "The Other DuPont Highway", the DuPont Highway being U.S. Route 13 in Delaware. It is rumored that Pierre S. duPont paved the road so that he and his friends and guests could travel more conveniently between his estate at Longwood Gardens in Kennett Square, Pennsylvania and the DuPont headquarters in Wilmington. It was eventually sold back to the state. Delaware Routes 52 and 100 constitute the Brandywine Scenic Byway.

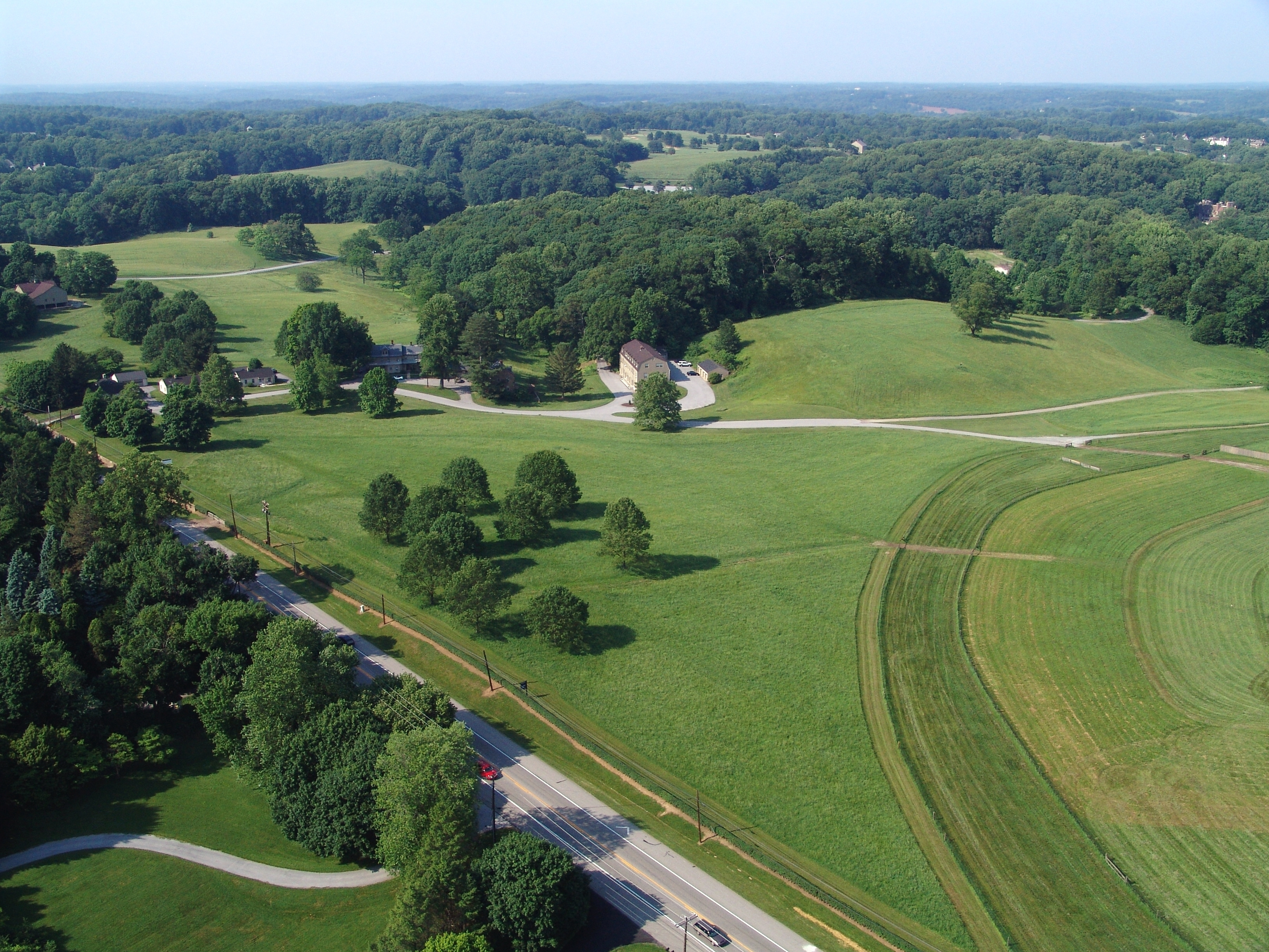
Delaware Route 52 near Winterthur showing Delaware's rolling Chateau Country

=== Chateau Country ===
Route 52 passes thru Delaware’s Chateau Country. Many DuPont homes and estates are tucked away in the areas surrounding Greenville, Delaware and Centreville, Delaware. Local residents have managed to preserve the rural character of Route 52 by controlling development. Twin Lakes Brewing Company in Greenville is on the farm of a DuPont heiress.

=== Winterthur Museum ===
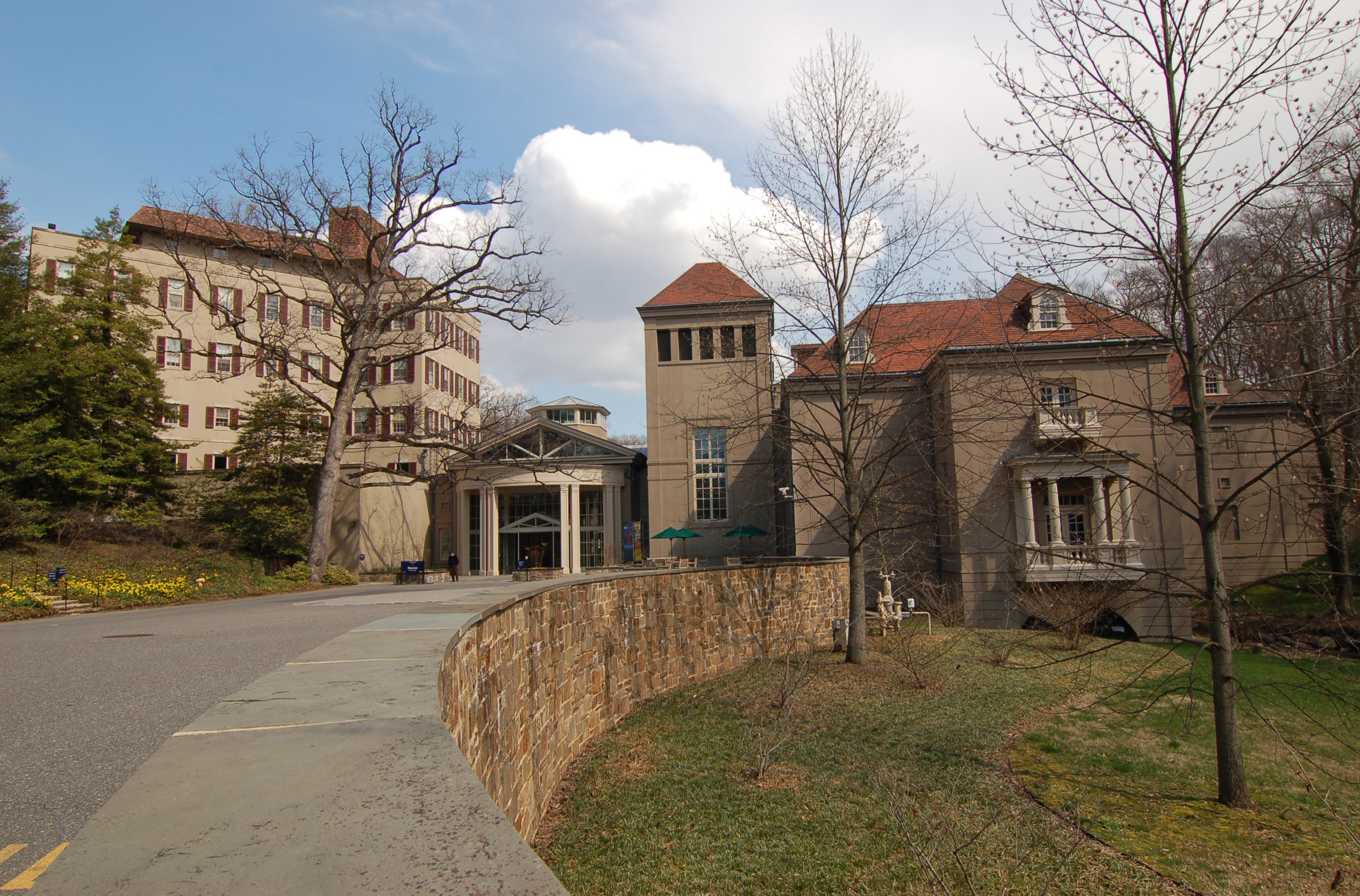
Winterthur museum

Between Greenville and Centerville lies the Winterthur Museum, Garden and Library. This museum in Winterthur, Delaware, houses one of the most important collections of Americana in the country. It was the former home of Henry Francis du Pont (1880–1969), a renowned collector of antiques and horticulturist.

The grounds are open to general admission and guided tours are available. The rolling countryside makes the annual Sunday Point-to-Point steeplechases, the carriage, buggy and surrey parade, the running of the hounds, and elegant tailgating a rite of spring in northern Delaware.

=== Longwood Gardens ===
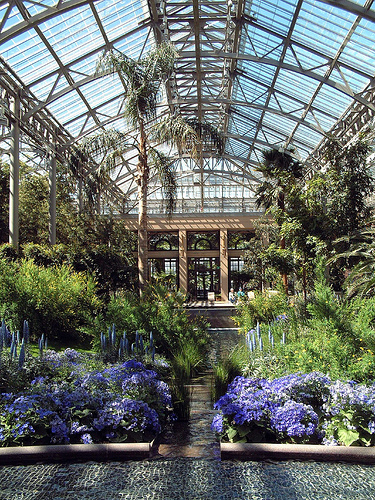
Newly renovated East Conservatory of Longwood Gardens

Longwood Gardens is located just beyond the intersection of Pennsylvania Route 52 and U.S. Route 1. It consists of 1,050 acres (4.2 km^{2}) of gardens, woodlands, and meadows in Kennett Square, Pennsylvania in the Brandywine Creek Valley and is one of the premier botanical gardens in the United States.

The property that is now Longwood Gardens was originally purchased from William Penn in 1700 by a fellow Quaker named George Peirce. In 1798 Joshua and Samuel Peirce planted the first specimens of an arboretum and by 1850 they had amassed one of the finest collections of trees in the nation. Pierre S. du Pont purchased the property from the Peirce family in 1906 to save the arboretum from being sold for lumber. He made it his private estate, and from 1906 until the 1930s, du Pont added extensively to the property, the most notable additions being the beautiful conservatory, complete with a massive pipe organ, and an extensive system of fountains. Mr. Du Pont opened his estate to the public many days of the year during his occupancy. He founded the Longwood Foundation in 1937, and in 1946 the foundation was chartered with running Longwood Gardens for the general education and enjoyment of the public. In addition to general admission, the gardens offer many special events during the year. These include concerts, firework and fountain displays to music, and Christmas lights.

=== The DuPont Building ===
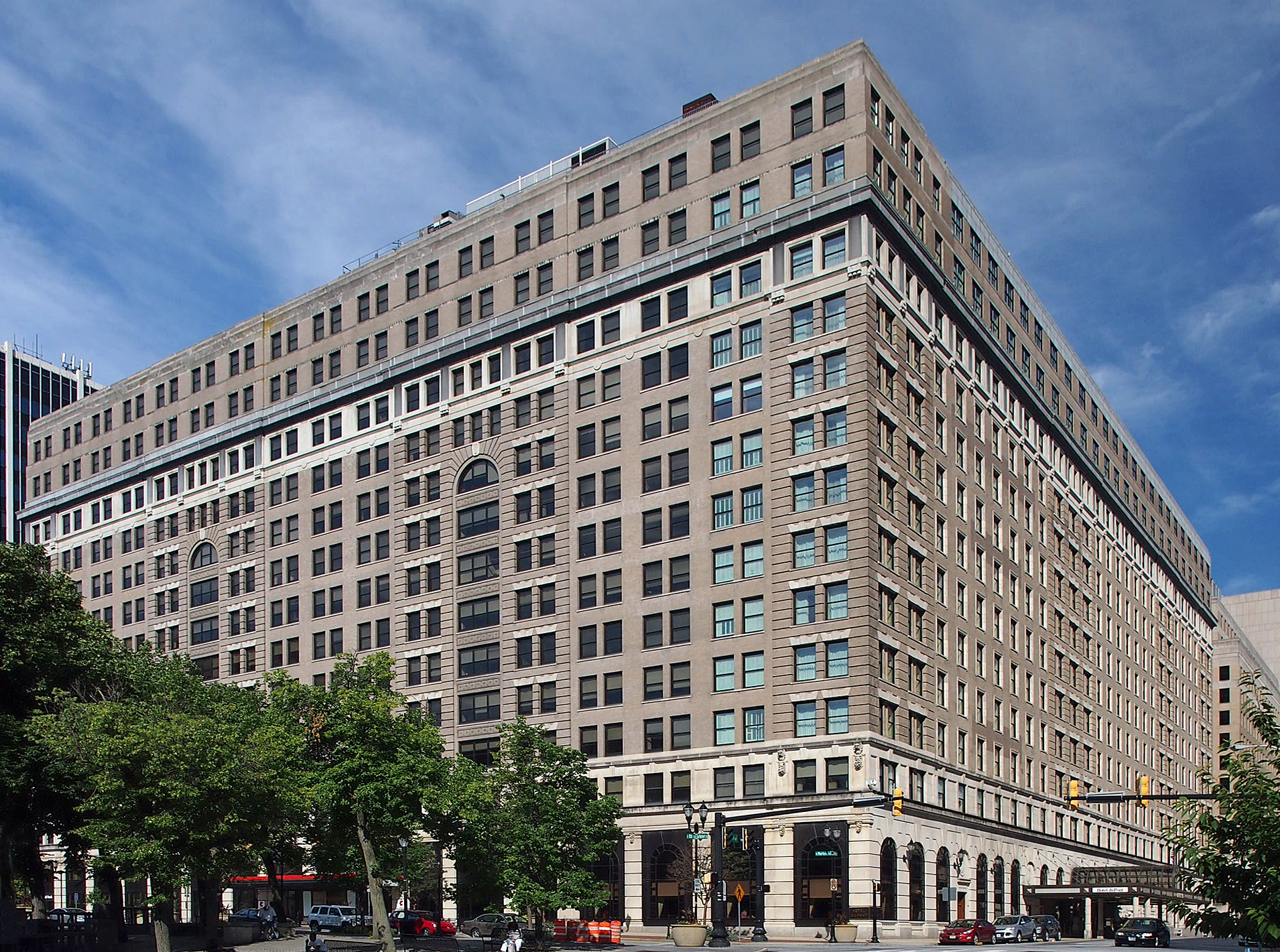
The DuPont Building on Rodney Square in Wilmington, Delaware

Heading south on Route 52 from Route 141, one enters Wilmington, Delaware, home to the headquarters of the DuPont Company. The most famous DuPont structure in Wilmington is the DuPont Building. The DuPont Building occupies the block bound by 10th, 11th, Orange and Market streets. It was one of the first high-rises in Wilmington, looking out over Rodney Square. The original portion of the building was constructed in 1908 and housed the corporate offices of DuPont. In 1913 the building was expanded into a "U" by adding wings along 10th and 11th streets, the DuPont Playhouse was added, and a portion of the original 1908 section was converted into the Hotel duPont. The final addition to the building occurred in 1923. The building houses DuPont's headquarters, the DuPont Theatre (formerly the Playhouse), the Hotel duPont, a bank and a number of small shops and offices.

== St. Joseph's on the Brandywine ==
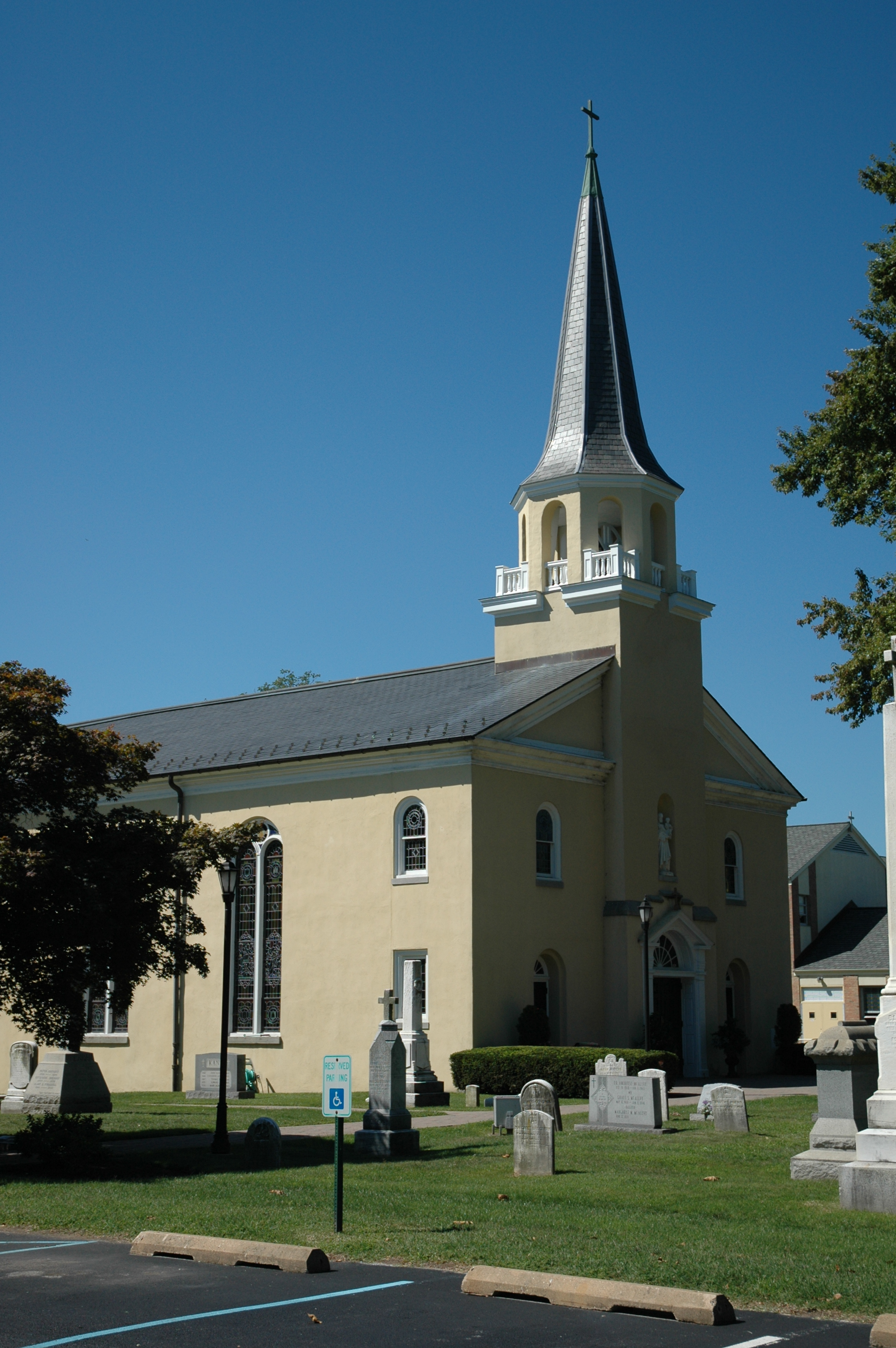
The front of the Saint Joes on the Brandywine in Greenville, Delaware.

St. Joseph's on the Brandywine Catholic church was built in 1841 by DuPont company stonemasons while there was a slack period in building the DuPont powder works. The ground adjacent to the DuPont powder mills was donated by Charles I. du Pont and the cost of construction was financed largely through loans and gifts from the DuPont company and family.

For eighty years the parish had a close relationship with the nearby mills. Parishioner's pew rents were collected by the pastor through DuPont Company payroll deductions. When the mills closed, parishioners moved away and by the 1930s it appeared that the church might be closed as well. It was saved when people began to move to the north of Wilmington and to the Greenville, Delaware and Centerville, Delaware areas. It is the home parish of United States President Joe Biden and several officers of the DuPont Company.

== Raskob Estate ==
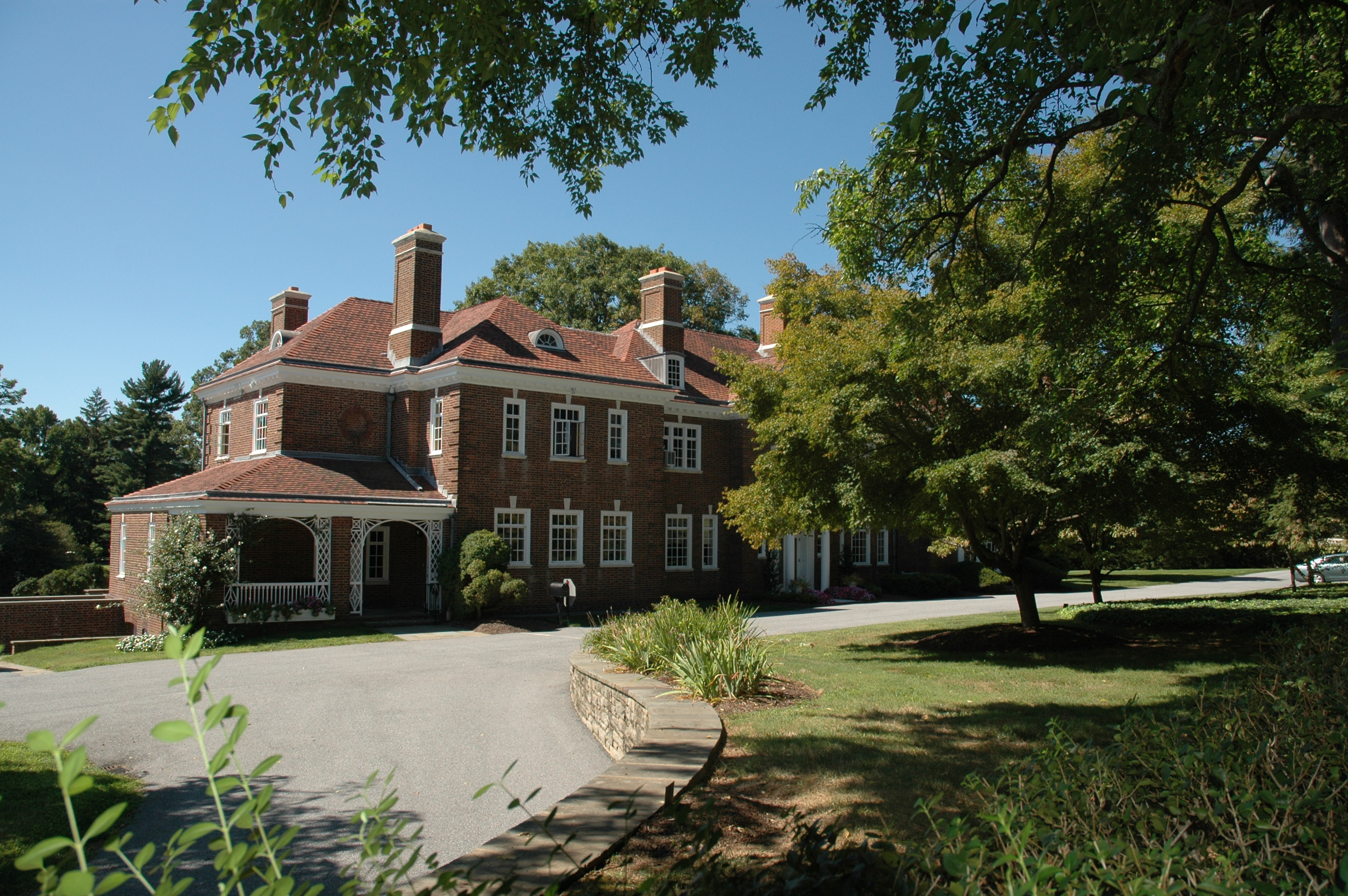
Irisbrook

John J. Raskob was hired in 1901 by Pierre S. du Pont as a personal secretary. In 1911, he became assistant treasurer of DuPont, in 1914 treasurer, and in 1918 vice-president for finance of both DuPont and General Motors. Raskob had been an early investor in General Motors and had engineered DuPont's ownership of 43% of GM, purchased from the financially troubled William C. Durant. While with GM, he led the creation of GMAC (now Ally Financial). He was the builder of the Empire State Building and the project was financed jointly with Pierre S. du Pont.

Like his fellow executives within DuPont, Raskob was a philanthropist. The Raskob Foundation for Catholic Activities has its corporate offices at "Irisbrook," the former residence of Raskob's younger brother, William F. Raskob. The Foundation is for the purpose of contributing exclusively to religious, charitable, literary and educational activities that will aid the Roman Catholic Church and institutions and organizations that are identified with it on an international basis. The estate has been divided and is now occupied primarily by the facilities of The Automation Partnership, a company devoted to high throughput screening, genomics automation, informatics, robotic cell culture, liquid handling and compound storage and retrieval. The graceful home, Irisbrook, is located on the southwest corner of the estate.

== Hagley Museum ==
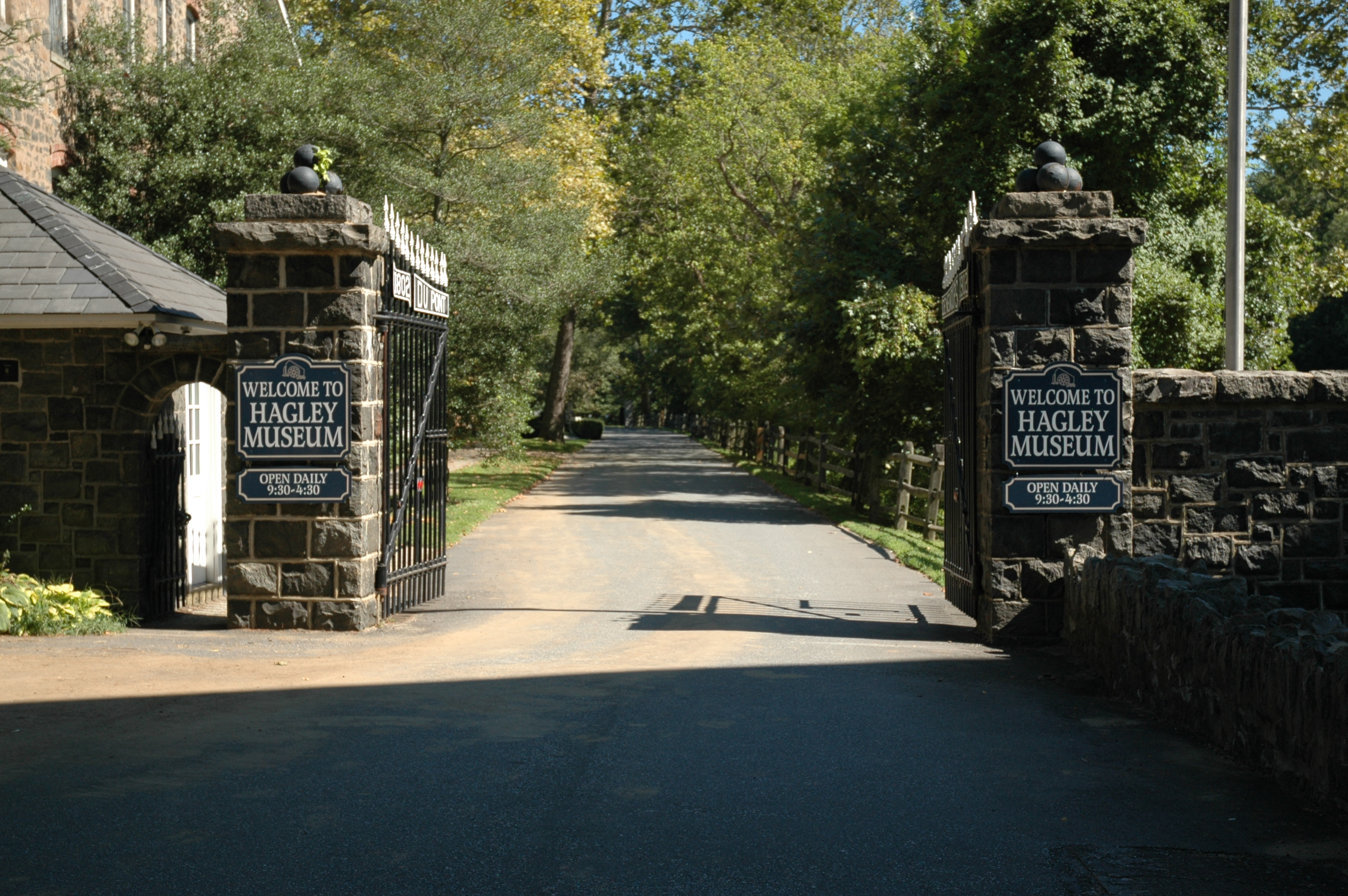
Entrance to Hagley Museum

Hagley Museum and Library is located on 235 acres (0.95 km^{2}) along the Brandywine Creek. It is “where the du Pont story begins.” Hagley is the site of the Eleutherian Mills gunpowder works founded by Eleuthère Irénée du Pont in 1802. It provides a glimpse at early American industry and includes restored mills, a workers' community, and the ancestral home and gardens of the du Pont family.

== Brandywine Creek ==
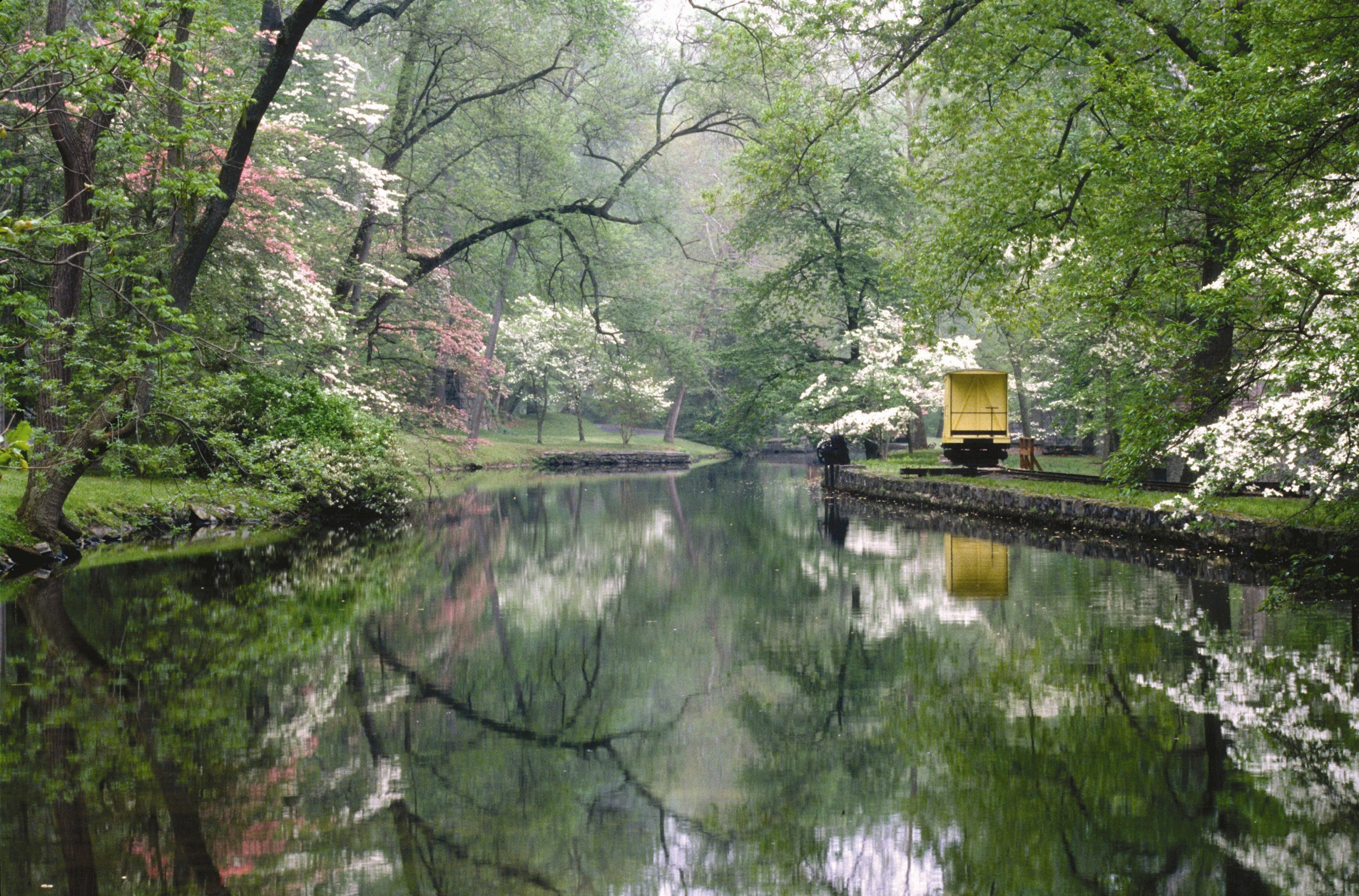
Mill race along the Brandywine Creek

The Brandywine Creek flows south through the Brandywine Creek State Park, into Wilmington where it flows through Brandywine Park near the city center. Along the way it flows past Hagley Museum and Library where it powered the powder mills of the early Dupont company. The flow of the creek is not substantial, though it is reliable, being fed by springs in Pennsylvania. There is a considerable drop in the elevation of the river in the vicinity of the powder works and water diverted by several dams into mill races provided sufficient power to operate the powder rolling mills. There are also dams below the powder works that provided power for mills located in Wilmington and much of the mill race network is still in good repair.

== DuPont Experimental Station ==
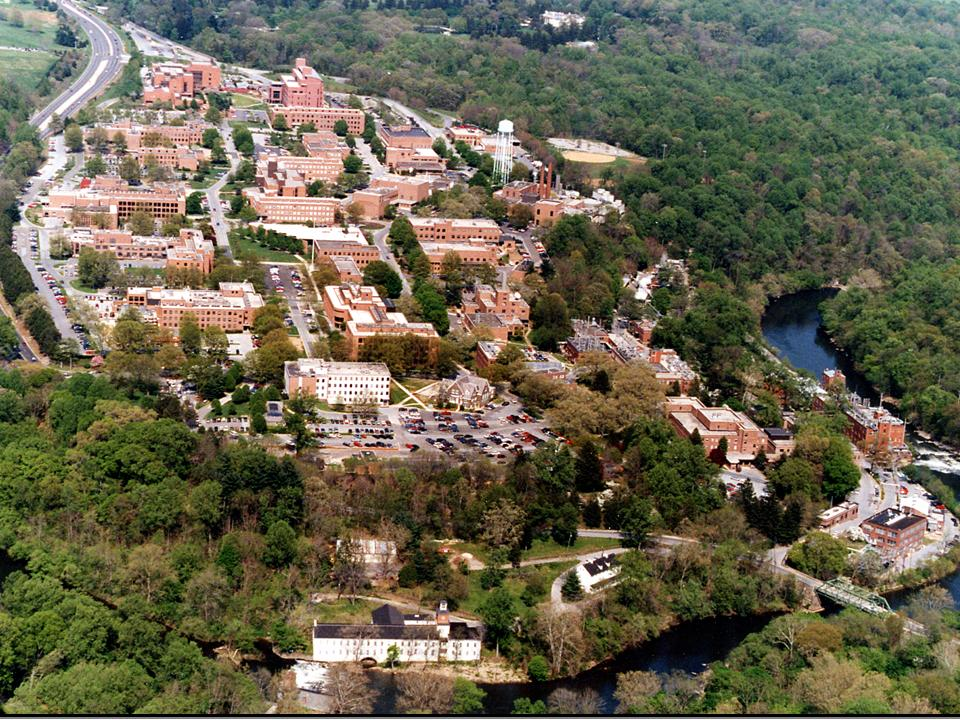
Aerial photo of the Dupont Experimental Station in the summer of 1997. The Brandywine Creek is in the immediate foreground and right. The stone building in the center of the picture is the original clubhouse of the Dupont Country Club which has now been displaced to the upper left of the photo. The Nemours Mansion and Gardens is seen in the upper center. Hagley Museum is off the picture to the immediate left. The highway in the upper left is Delaware Route 141, and all of this is part of the DuPont Historic Corridor.

The land immediately across the Brandywine Creek from Eleutherian Mills was owned by DuPont for safety reasons. Development was precluded because the powder mills along the creek were designed in such a manner that if there were any to be any explosions (and there were), the blast would be directed at the substantial and heavily-wooded hillside across the creek. After the mills were closed, DuPont established the DuPont Experimental Station in this location. It was also the location of the original nine holes of the DuPont Country Club, but this golf course was pushed northeastward by the gradual expansion of the Experimental Station.

The DuPont Experimental Station is the largest research and development facility of E. I. du Pont de Nemours and Company and is home to some of the most important discoveries of the modern chemical industry. Thus, it is not only part of the history of the company, it is also playing an important role in DuPont's future. It was established in 1903 as an effort to move the DuPont Company from gunpowder and explosives into the new age of chemistry. As one of the first industrial research laboratories in the United States, the 150 acre (0.61 km2) campus-style Experimental Station serves as the primary research and development facility for DuPont. It is home to DuPont Central Research and most other business units of DuPont are also represented on site.

The Experimental Station is a Certified Wildlife Habitat Council Site. In addition to ubiquitous pigeons and crows, animal species that are common on site include eastern cottontails, white-tailed deer, red-tailed hawks, groundhogs or woodchucks, eastern gray squirrels, and ruby-throated hummingbirds. Red-tailed hawks and red fox keep populations in control and a nearby colony of turkey vultures keep the grounds free of carrion.

== Nemours Mansion and Gardens ==
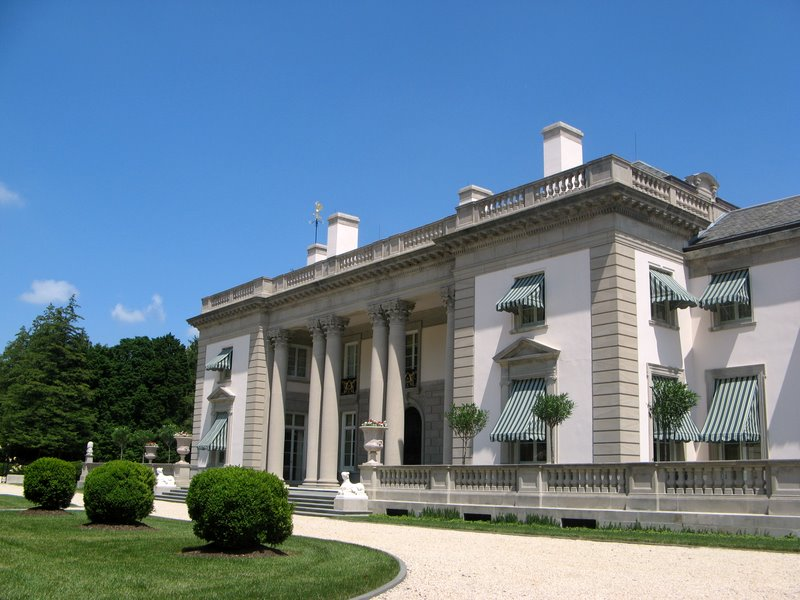
Nemours Mansion from the front

The Nemours Mansion and Gardens is a 300-acre (1.2 km^{2}) country estate with jardin à la française formal gardens and a classical French mansion. This is all sealed away behind a stone fence topped with glass shards said to have been built to keep out the relatives.

The mansion resembles a Château and contains more than seventy rooms spread over five floors occupying nearly 47,000 sq ft (4,400 m^{2}). The estate is owned by the Nemours Foundation. Nemours was created by Alfred I. du Pont in 1909–1910, and named for a French town affiliated with his great-great-grandfather, Pierre Samuel du Pont de Nemours. Carrère and Hastings designed home in the style of Louis XVI—Rococo French architecture. Guided tours are open to the public with reservations highly recommended and required for groups.

== Nemours Children's Hospital, Delaware ==
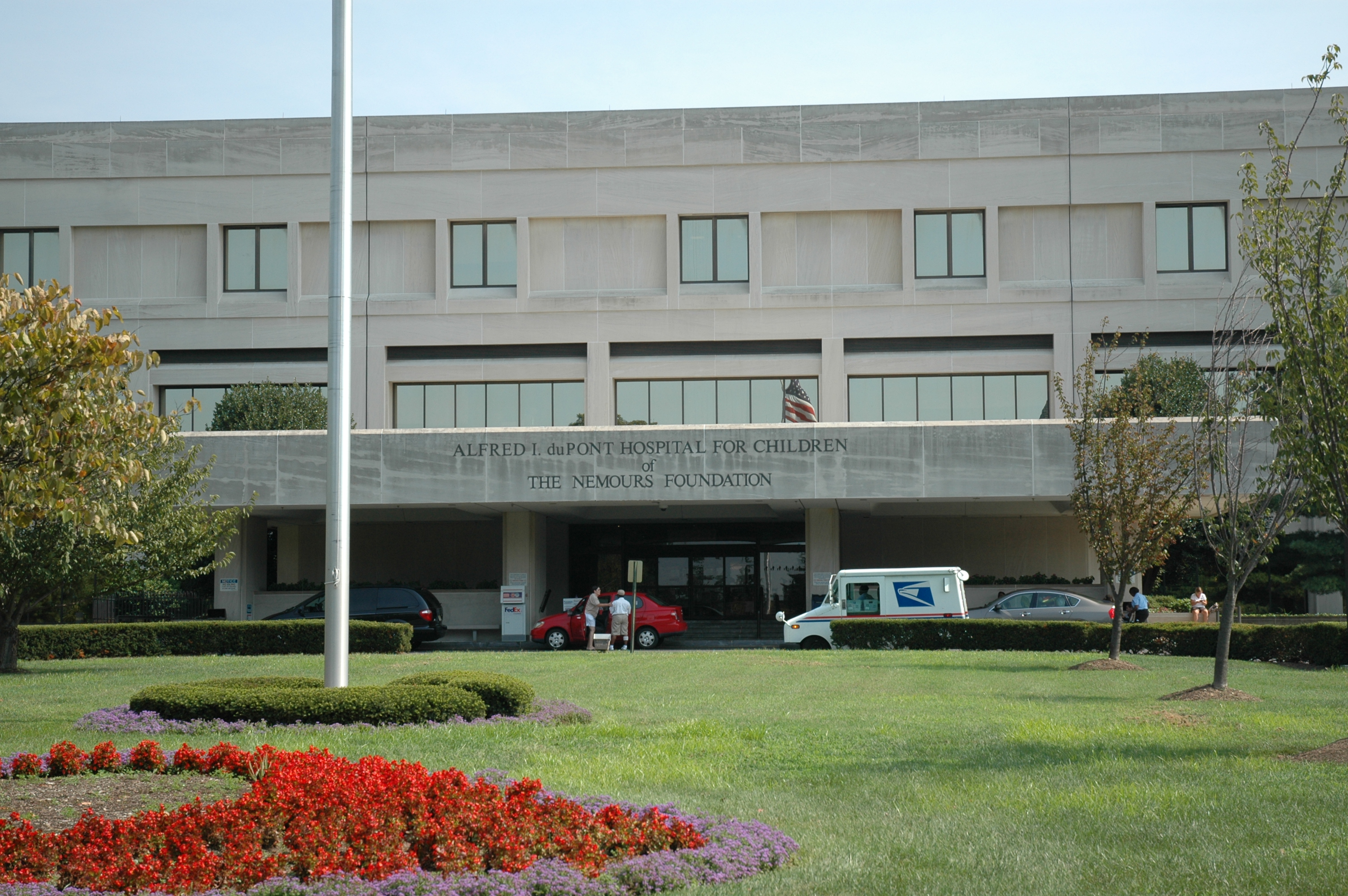
Main entrance of Nemours Children's Hospital, Delaware

Nemours Children's Hospital, Delaware is a pediatric hospital located in Wilmington, Delaware. It is controlled by the Nemours Foundation, a non-profit organization created by philanthropist Alfred I. du Pont in 1936. With the conviction that it is the duty of everyone to do what is within his power to alleviate human suffering, he bestowed an estate valued at $40 million for the creation of a charitable corporation devoted primarily to providing health care services to children. The resulting Nemours Foundation was charged with the care and treatment of disabled children and the care of low-income seniors throughout the state of Delaware. Nemours has grown to be one of the nation’s largest children’s health systems caring for more than a quarter of a million children each year.

== DuPont Country Club ==
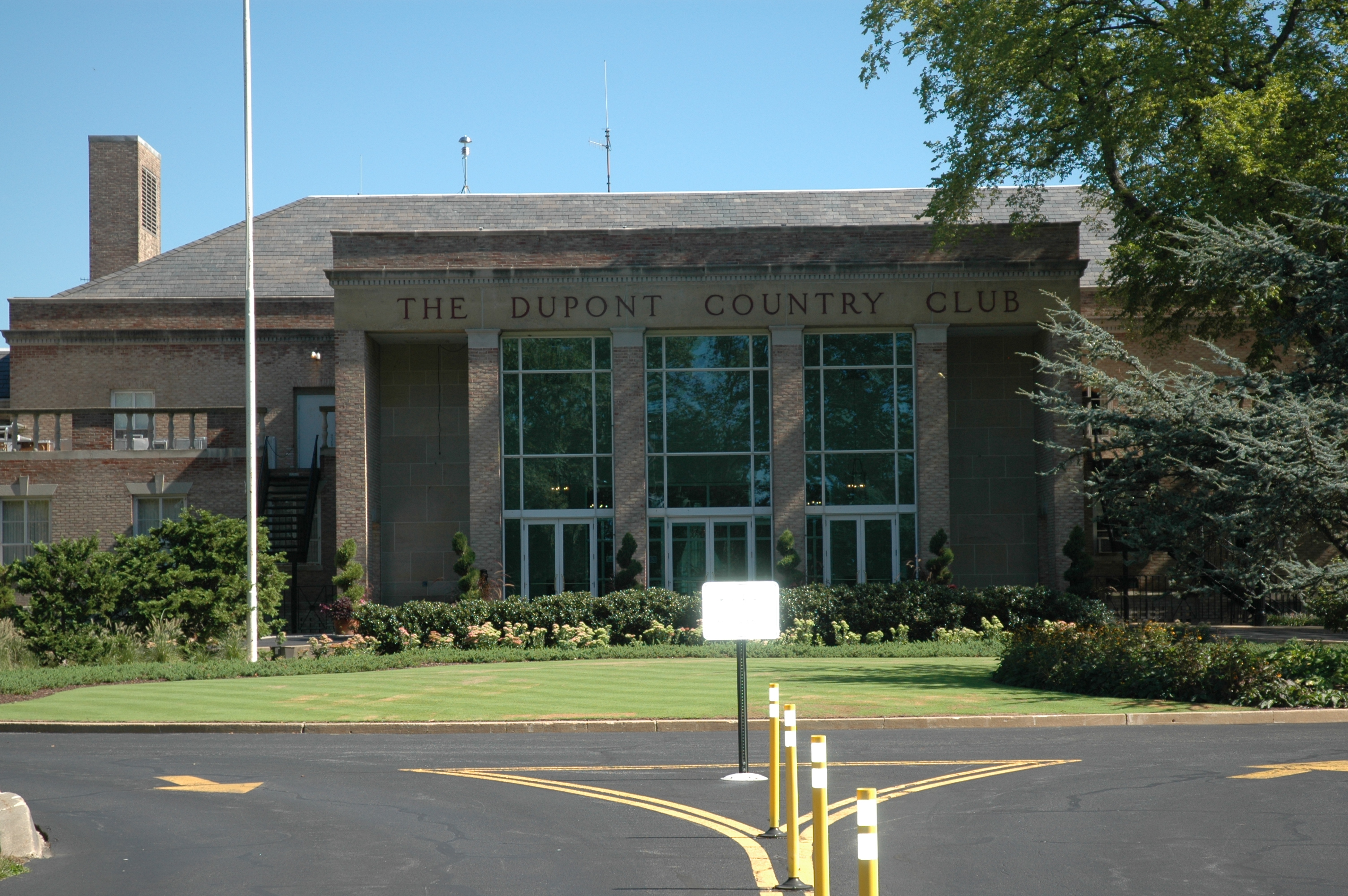
The DuPont Country Club

The DuPont Country Club is a recreational facility formerly owned and operated by the Dupont Company. The DuPont Country Club was incorporated in 1920, with a total of 600 members. The first “clubhouse” consisted of a two-story house and baseball diamond and grandstand. The original DuPont Course, a 9-hole layout with clay tees and sand greens was designed by Wilfrid Reid, and constructed in 1921. This original course was lost to the expansion of the DuPont Experimental Station and two new courses and a clubhouse were built on their present site. The clubhouse of the original course became the cafeteria of Experimental Station employees and the original pro-shop became the home of the DuPont employees' credit union. From 1994 to 2004, it hosted the LPGA Championship, one of four women's major golf championships. In 2018, the club was acquired by Rockland Sports, LLC.

=== Brantwyn ===
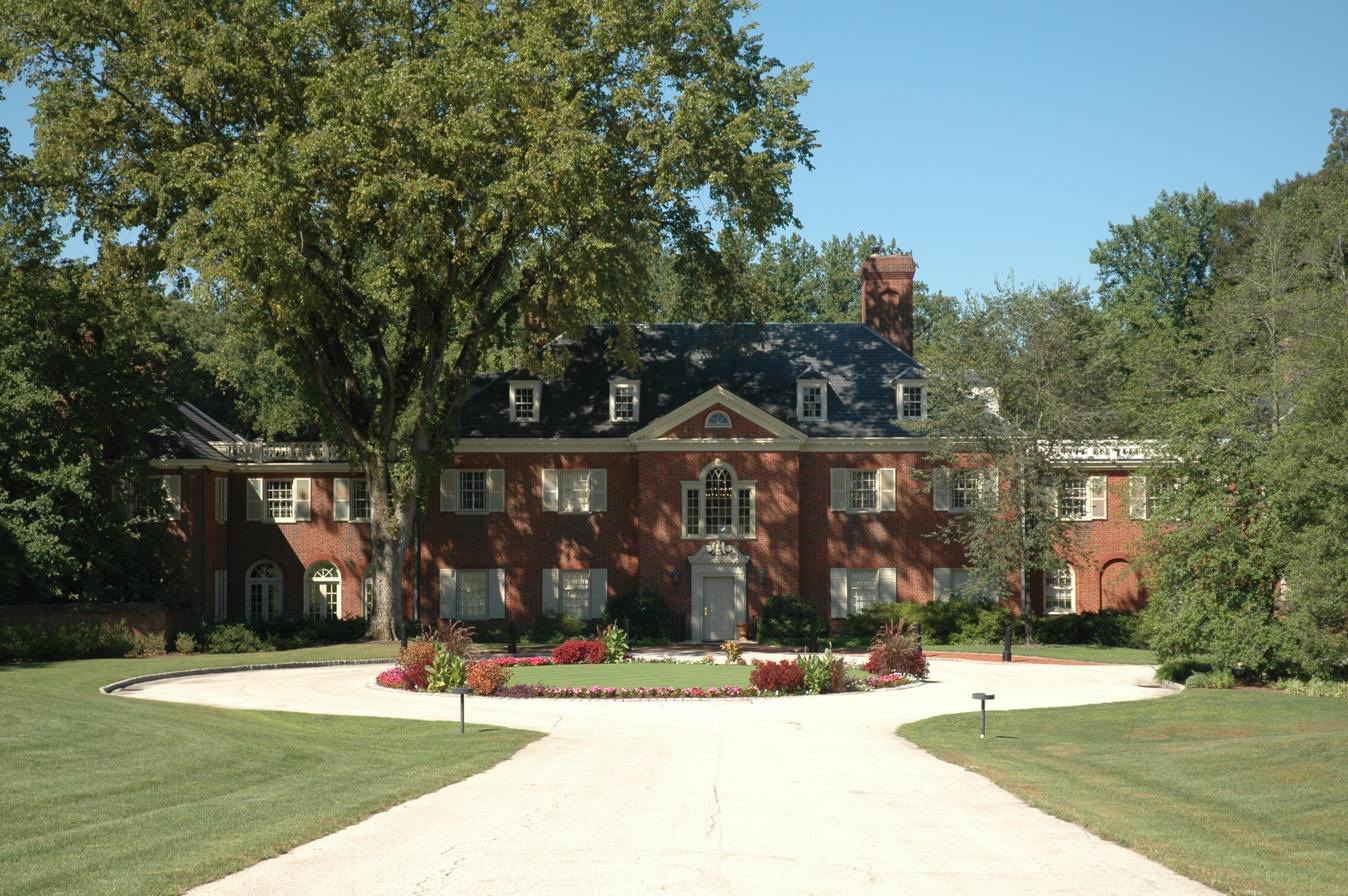
Brantwyn at the DuPont Country Club

The DuPont Country Club also includes the Dupont estate, Brantwyn, the childhood home of Pierre S. du Pont, IV. The home’s name is likely a derivative of the name Brandywine. The creek's name may be from an old Dutch word for brandy or gin, brandewijn, or from the name of an early mill owner, Andreas Brainwende or Brantwyn.

== Blue Ball Barn ==
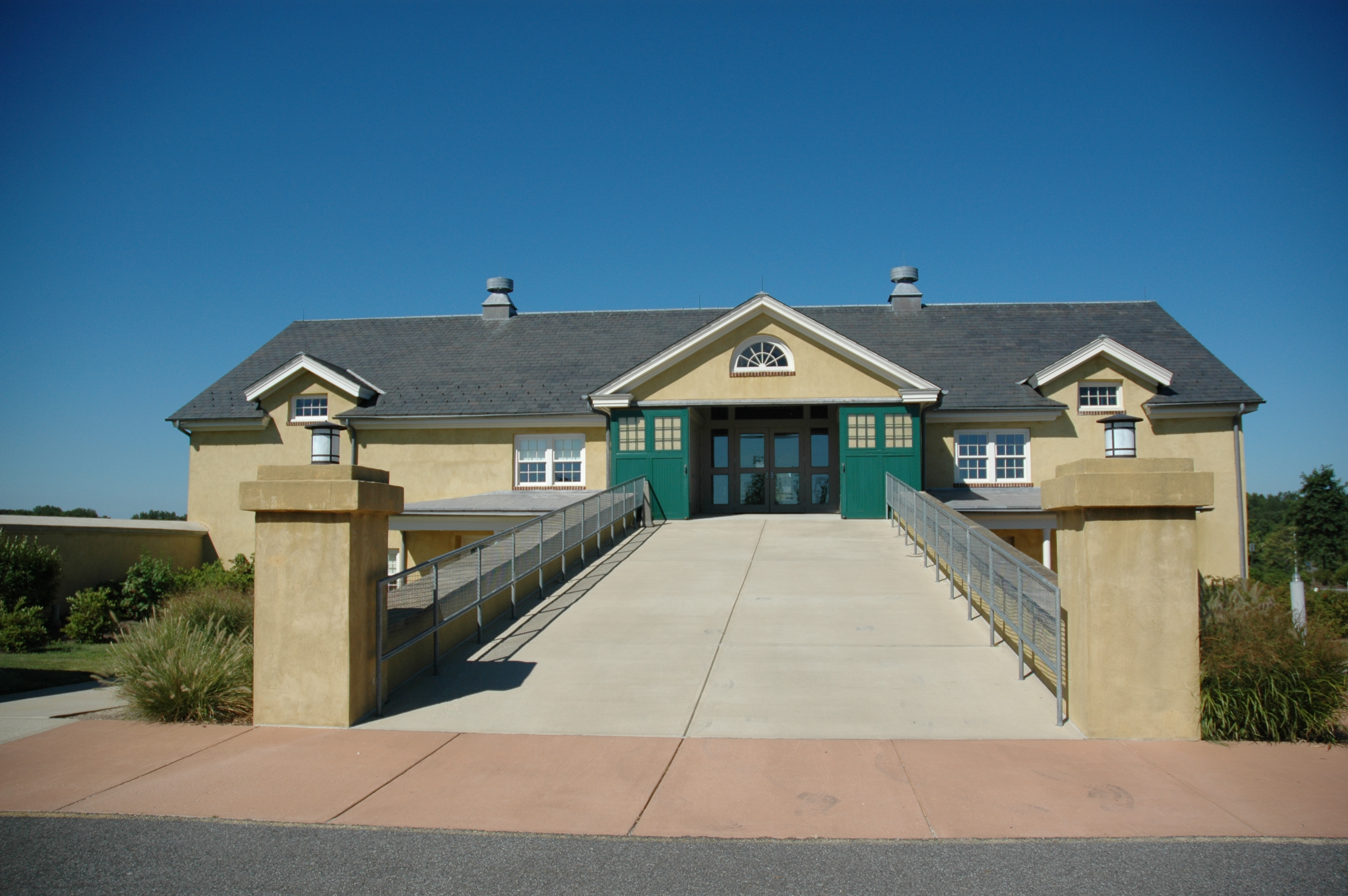
Front view of the DuPont dairy barn at BlueBall.

Off the map is an extraordinary dairy barn, built in 1914 by Alfred I. DuPont to service Nemours. Adjacent is a glass-tiled milk-house. The facility was designed to be the most modern dairy barn in the United States at the time. The upper floor of the barn stored feed for the cattle. The milking parlor and calving area occupied the lower level. Cattle waiting to be milked were kept in a stucco-walled courtyard.

It is named after the Blue Ball Tavern, an inn and meeting house, that was once located near the property. A blue ball attached to a pole in front of the tavern served as a signal to stagecoach drivers to stop to pick up passengers, hence the name “Blue Ball Tavern.” The preserved and renovated Blue Ball Barn is the centerpiece of the new Alapocas Run State Park. The Blue Ball Barn is permanent home to the Delaware Folk Art Collection and there is an exhibit on the history of the barn.

== Gallery ==
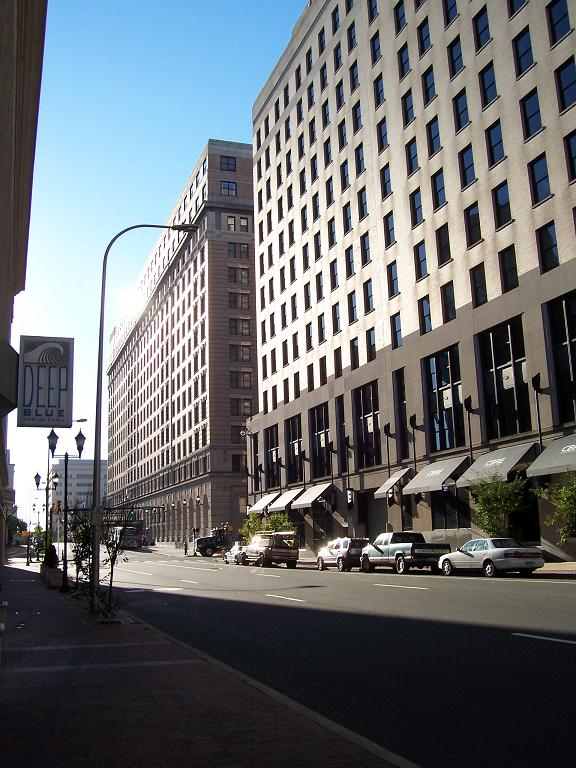
The DuPont Building (center left) and the Nemours Building (right) in 2006.

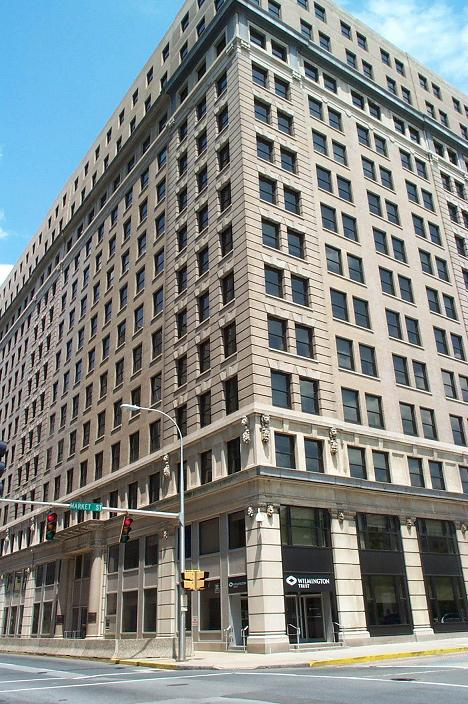
The DuPont building from the corner of Market and 10th with the Wilmington Trust branch.

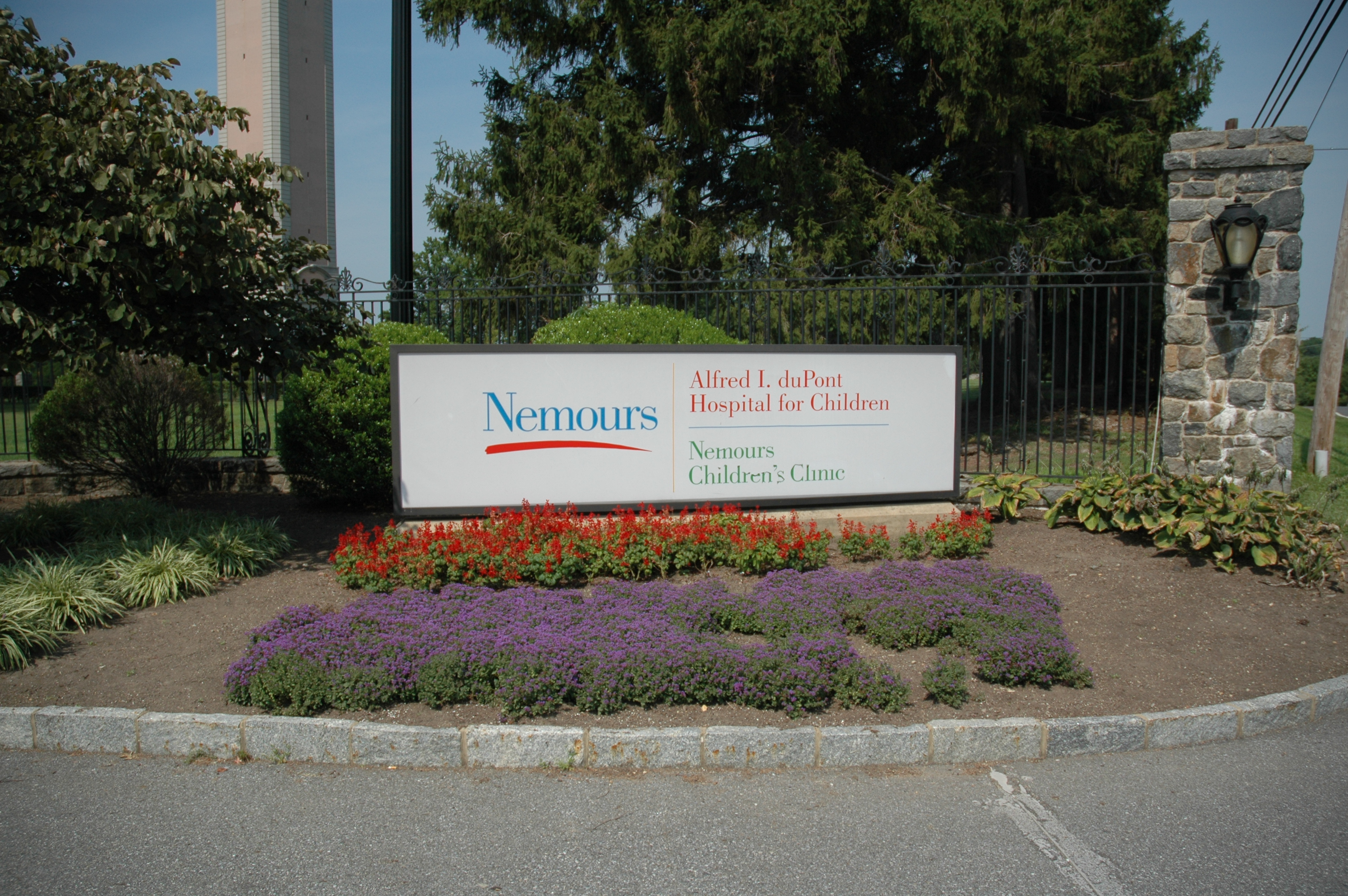
Main entrance to the Alfred I. duPont Hospital for Children from Children's Way. The Nemours carillon is in the background.

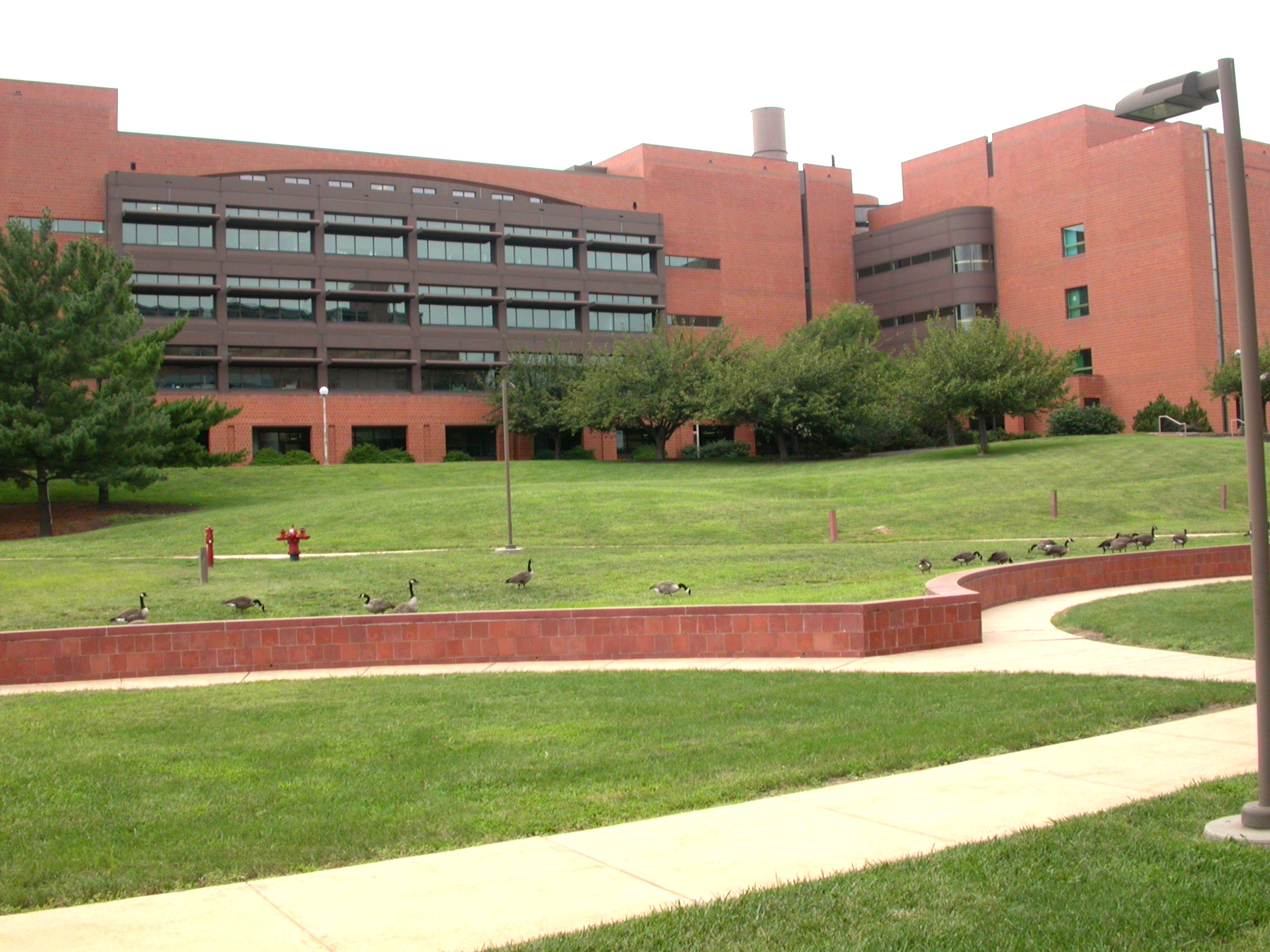
Building E400 on the DuPont Experimental Station with Canada geese who are frequent visitors.

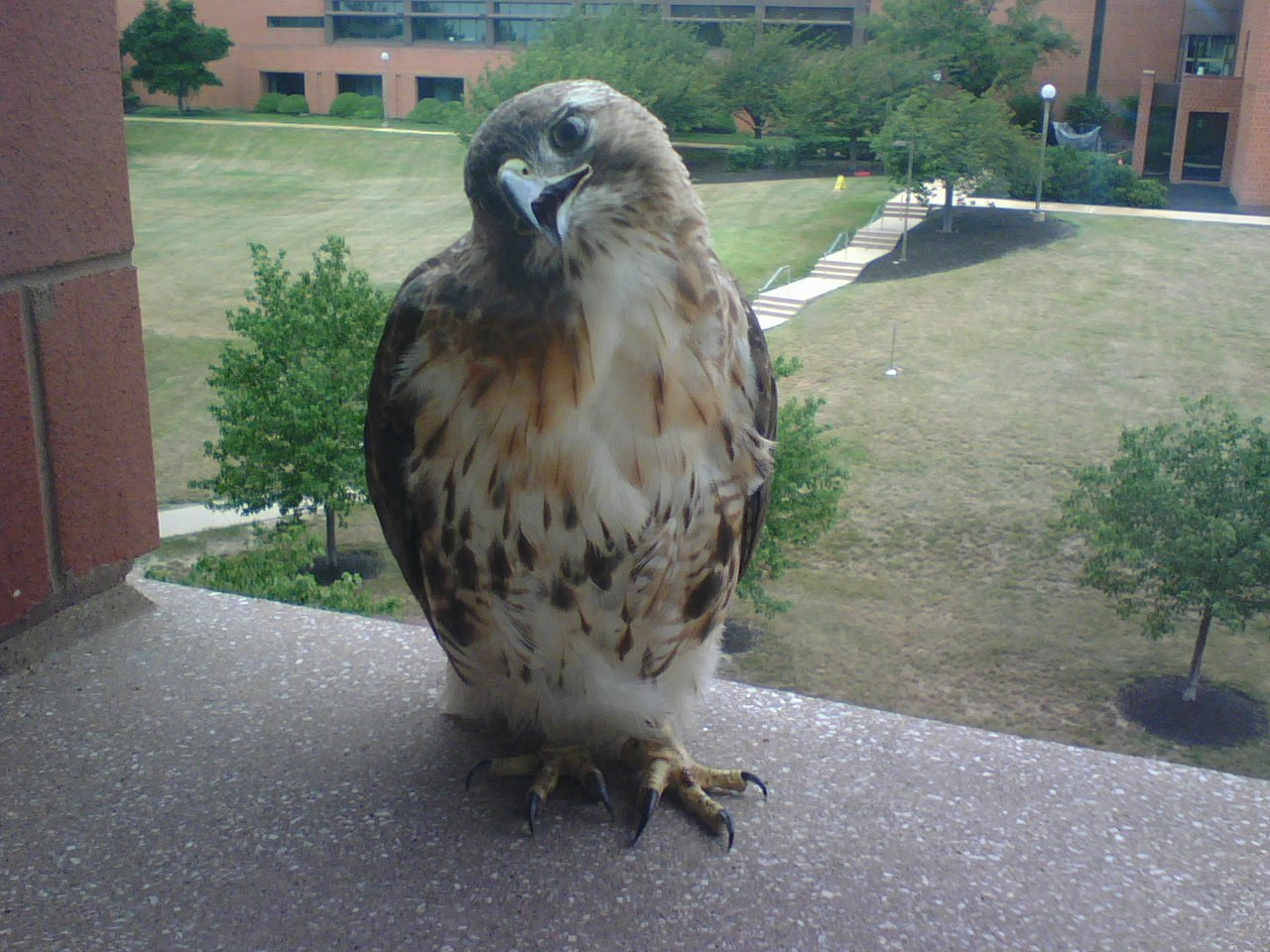
An immature red-tailed hawk looking at the chemists inside E500 at the DuPont Experimental Station.

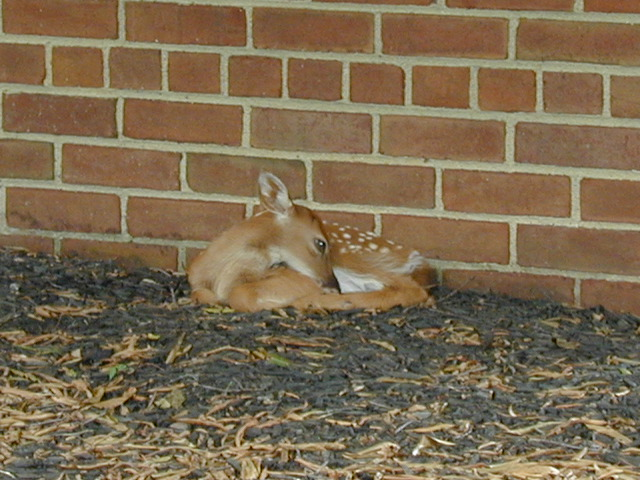
A white-tailed deer fawn, just hours old, outside the entrance to Medical at the DuPont Experimental Station.

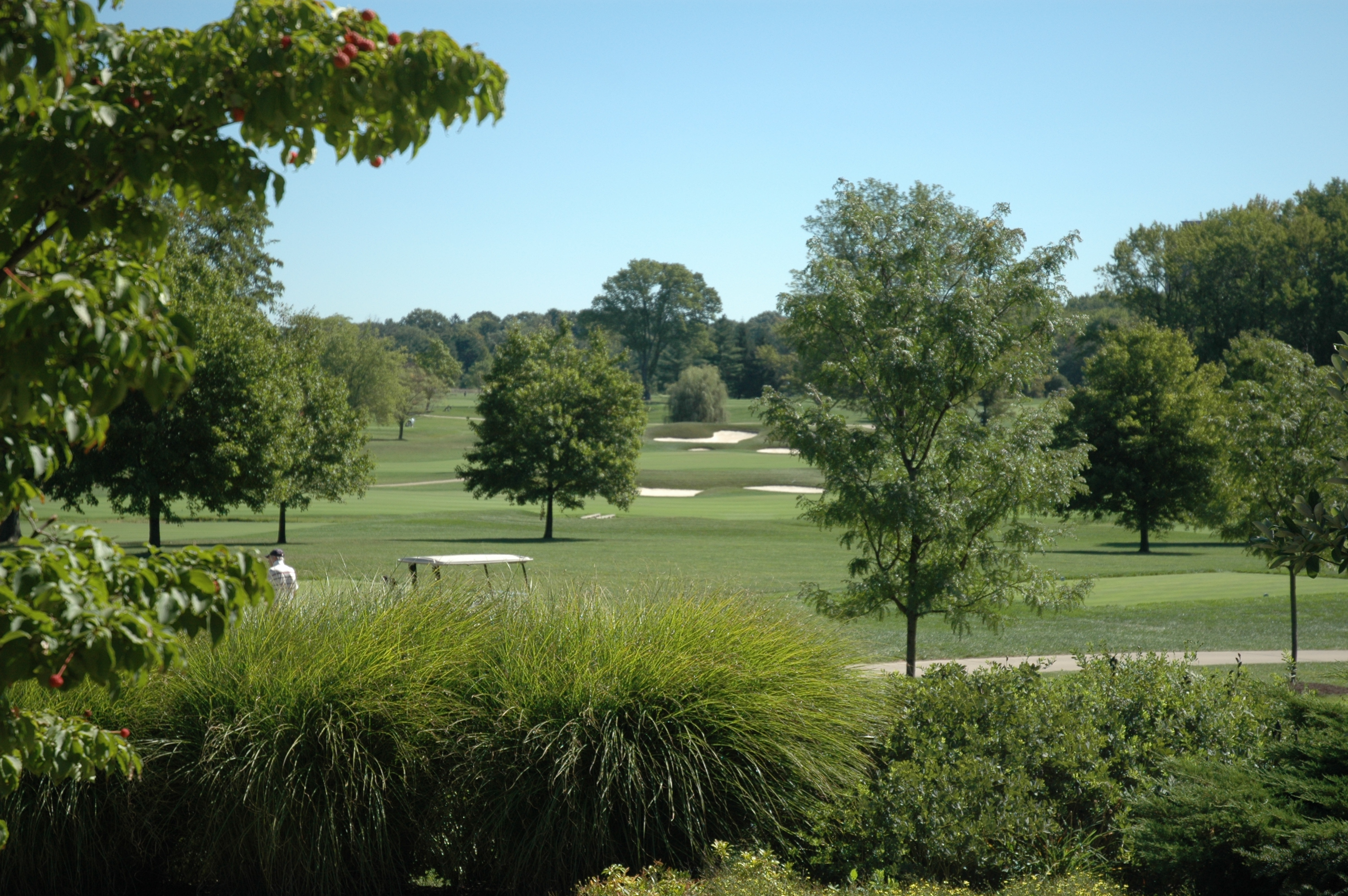
Fairway of the DuPont Country Club

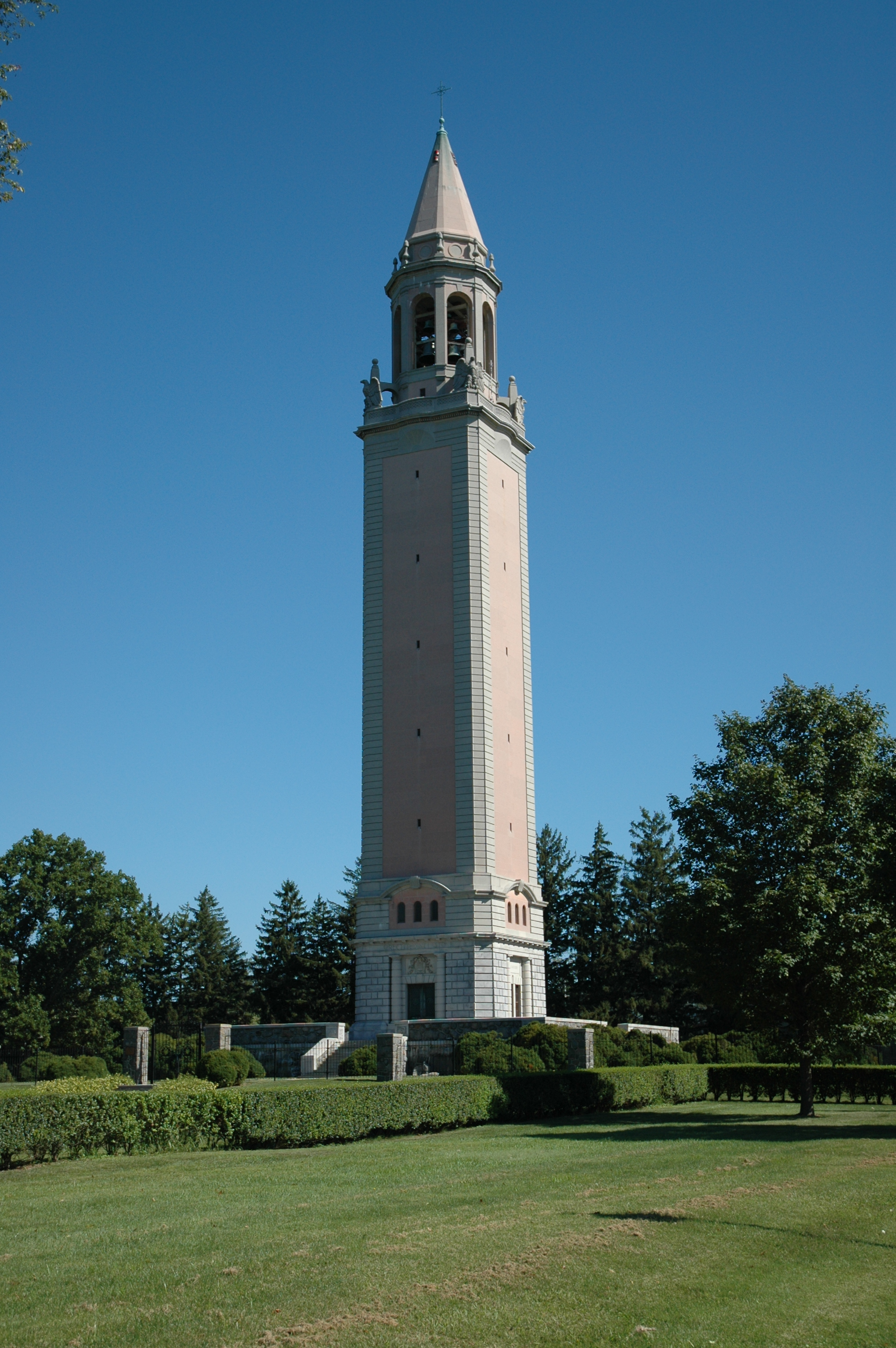
Carillon at the Nemours Estate

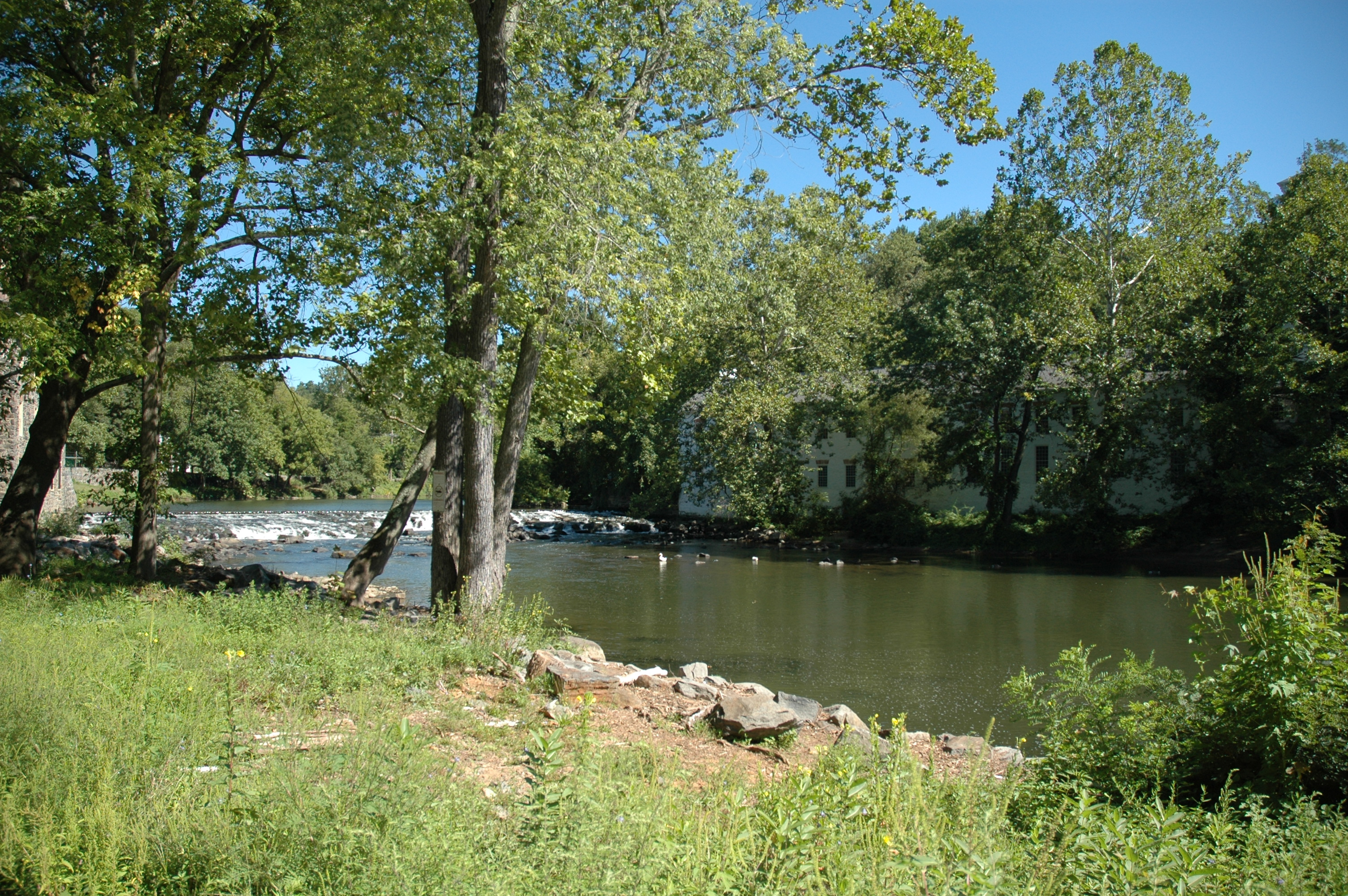
Brandywine Creek just below Hagley Museum

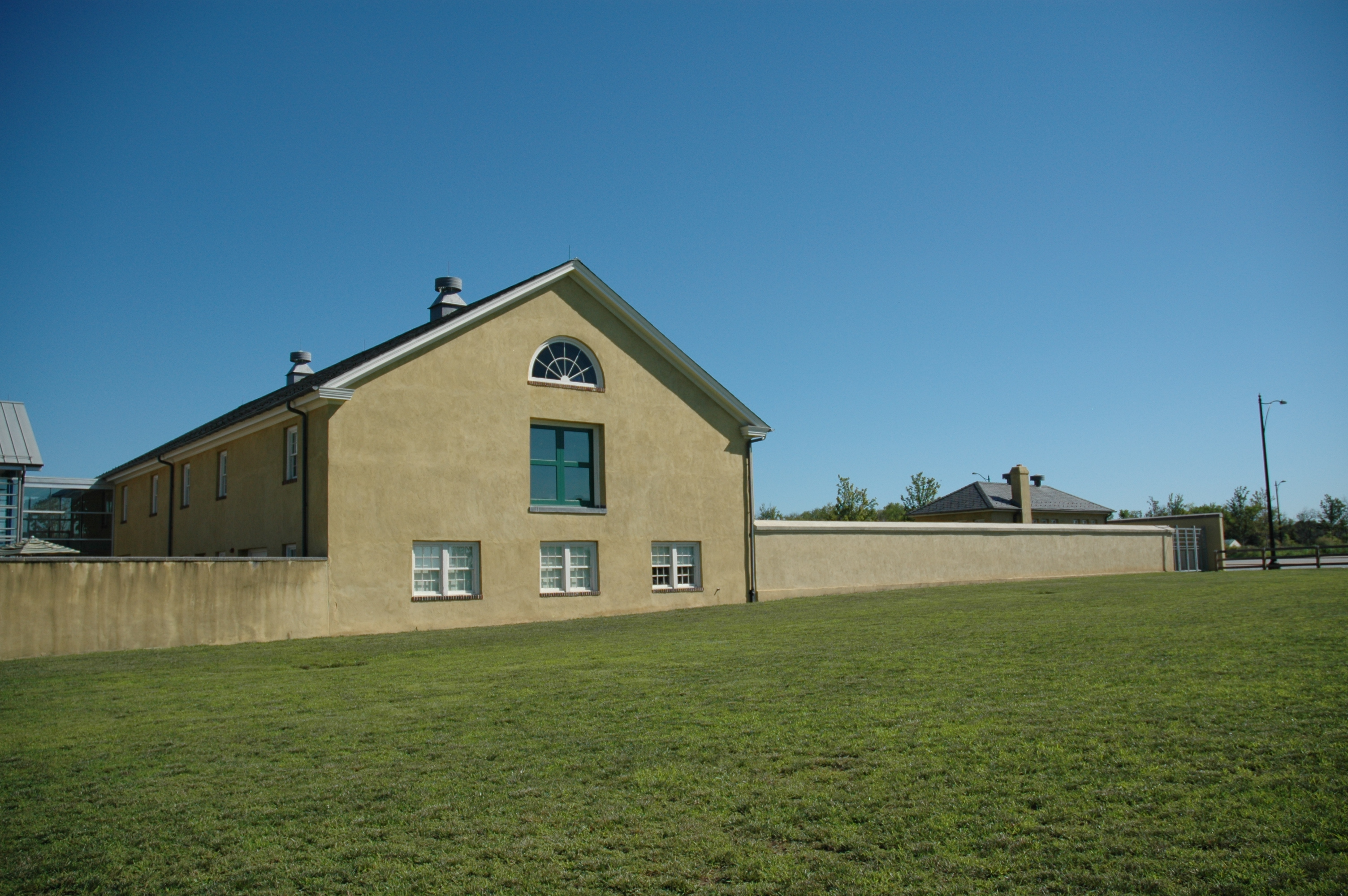
Side view of the Blue Ball dairy barn that was part of the Nemours estate

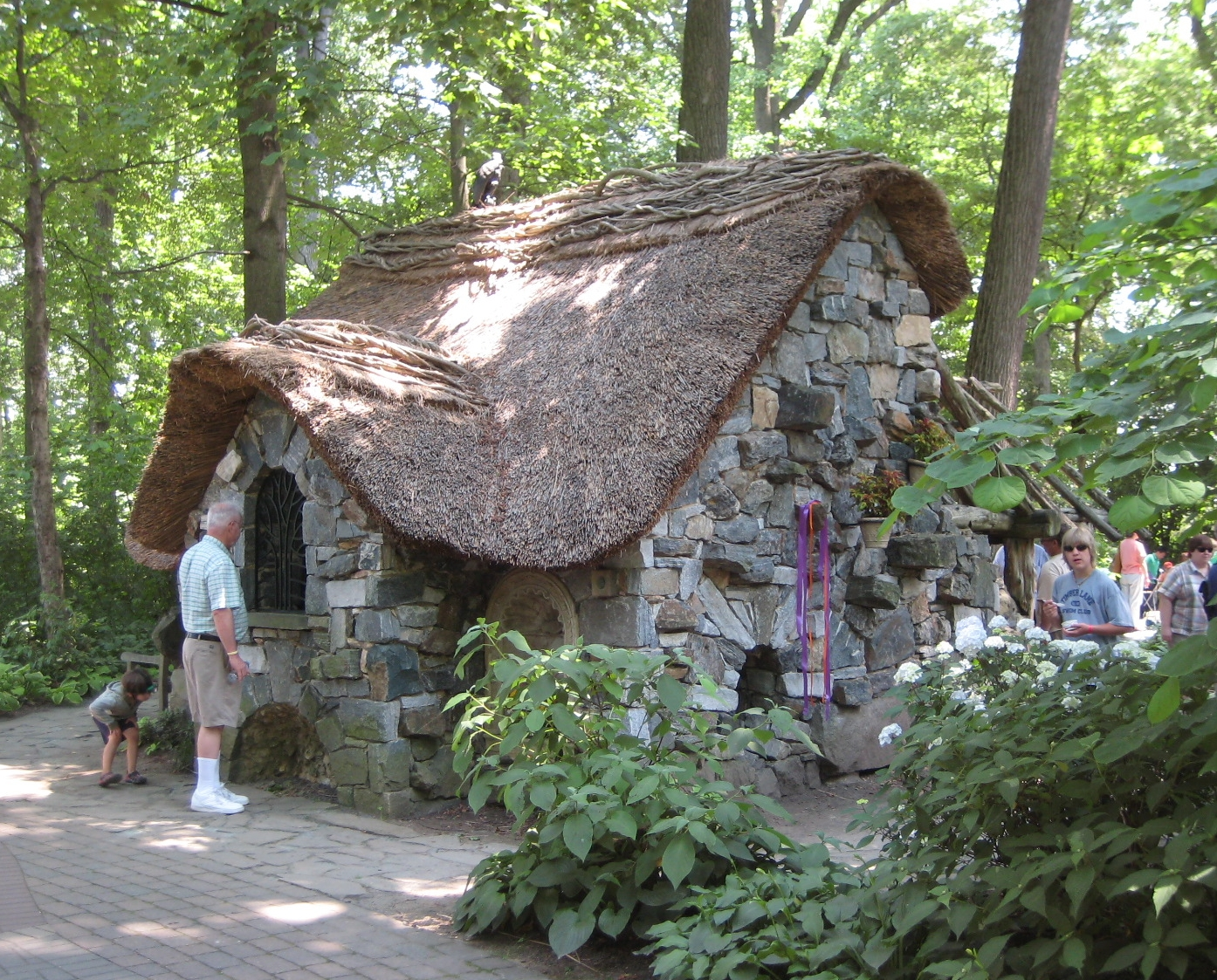
A cottage in the "Enchanted Garden" section of the grounds, intended for families with children

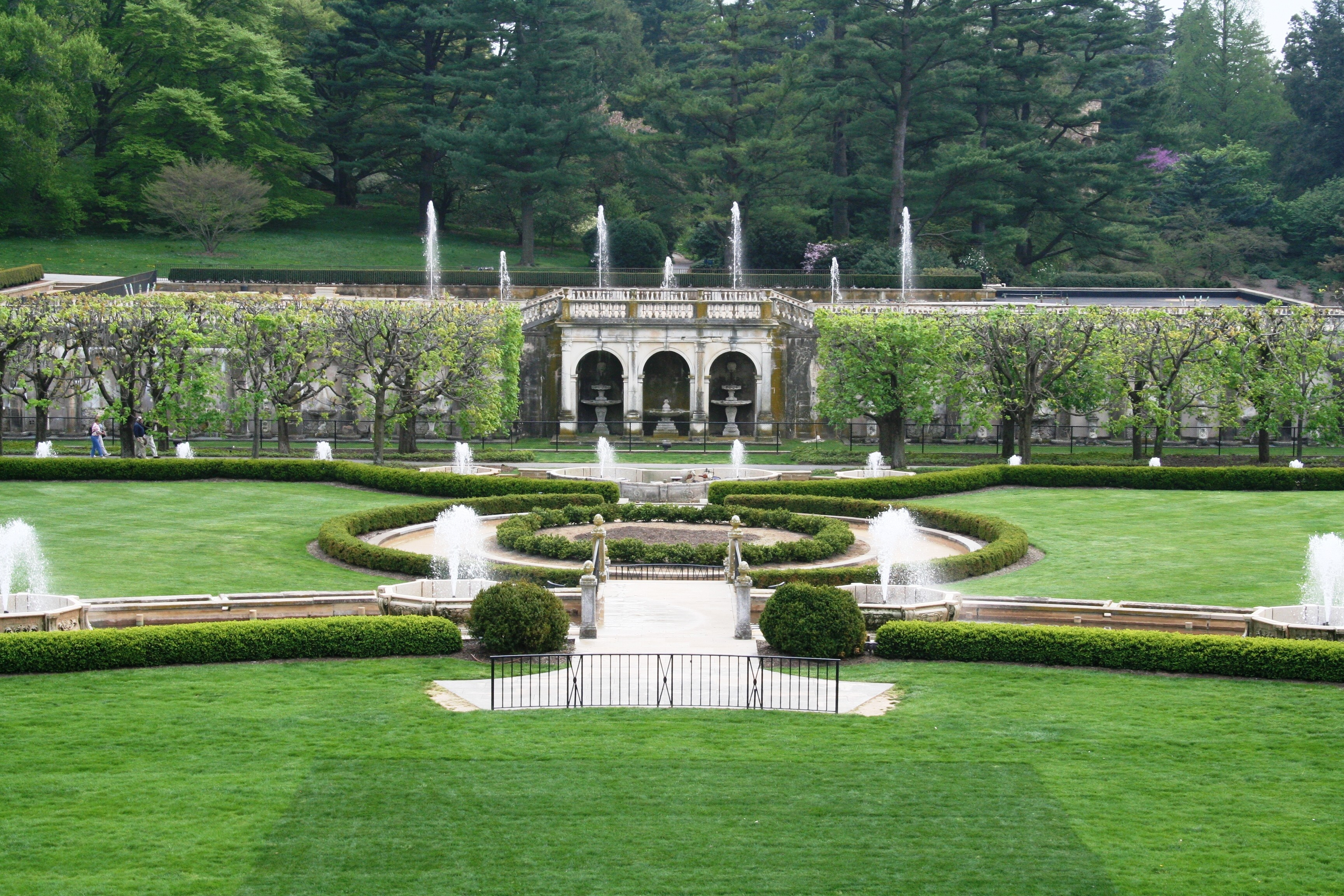
Main Fountains at Longwood Gardens

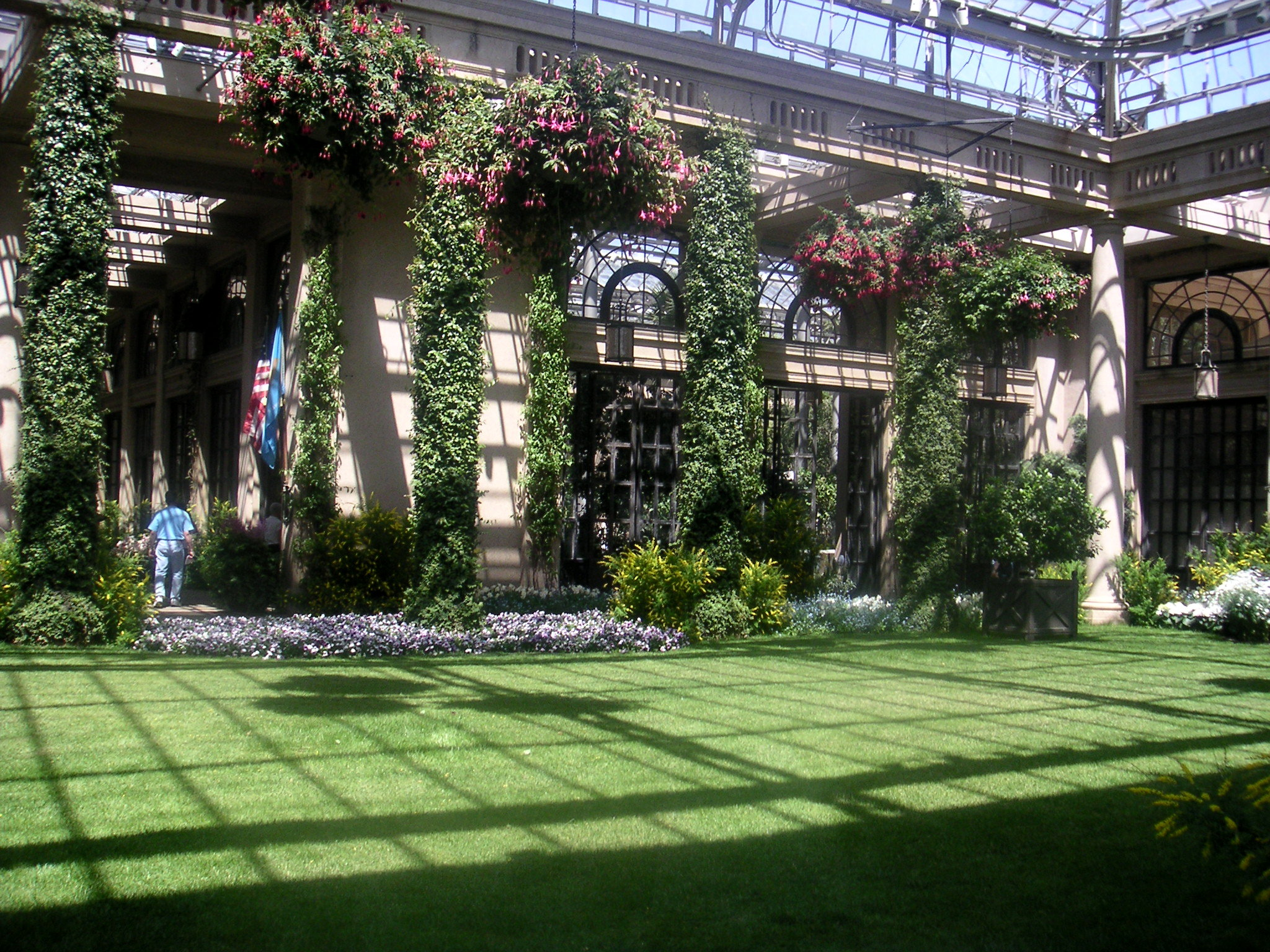
Indoor Conservatory at Longwood Gardens

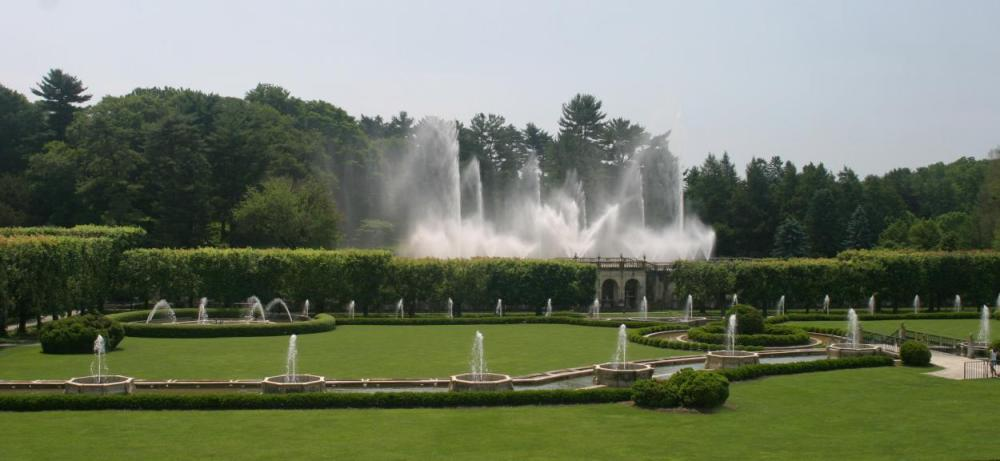
The main fountains at Longwood Gardens

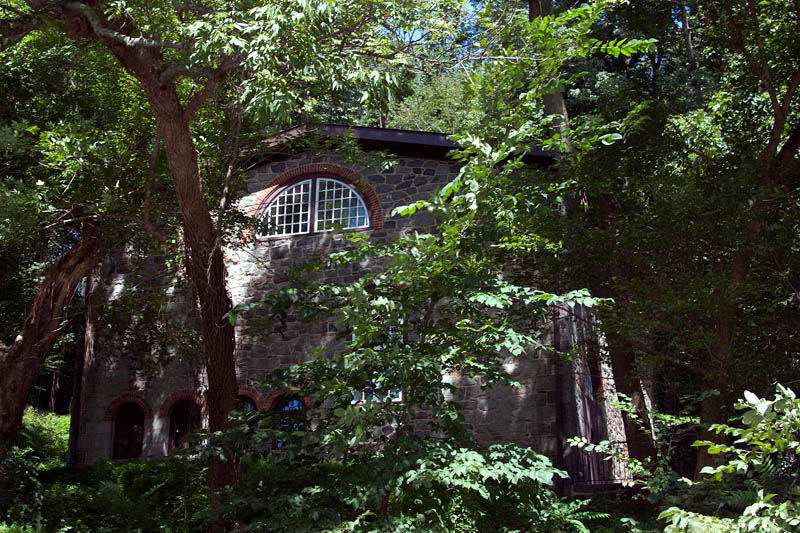
Restored Gunpowder Mill at Hagley Museum and Library

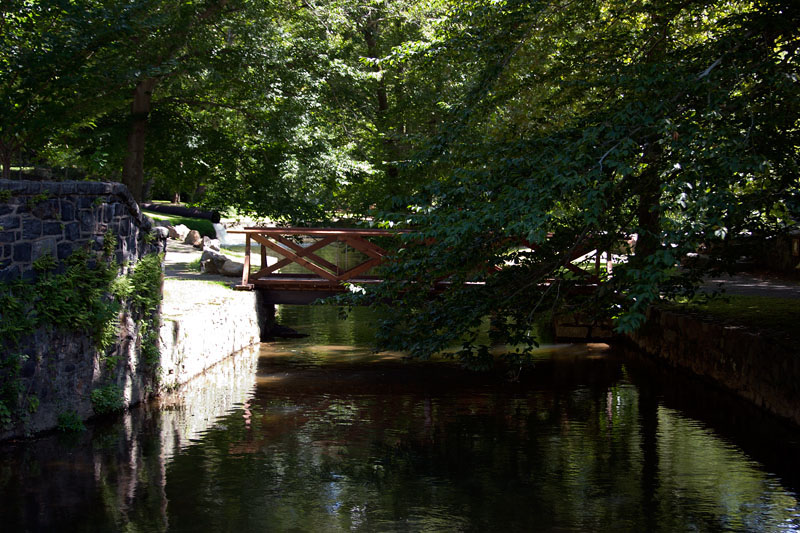
Mill Race at Hagley Museum and Library

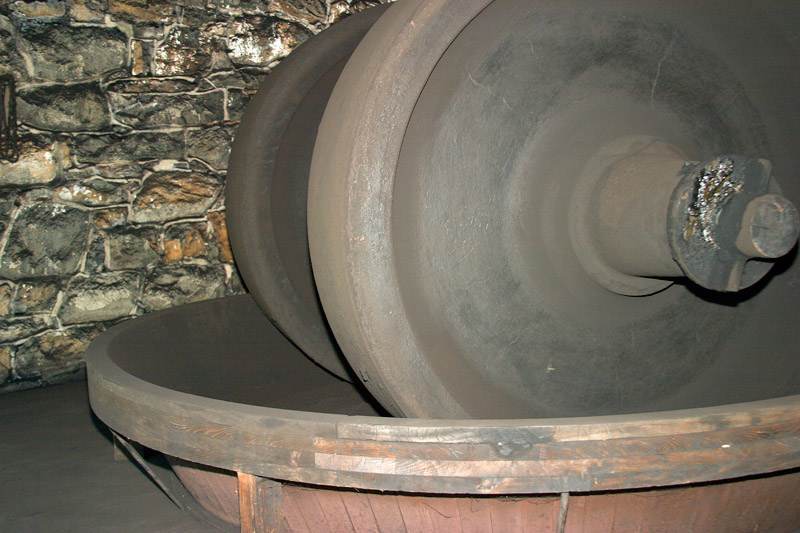
Restored Mill Equipment at Hagley Museum and Library

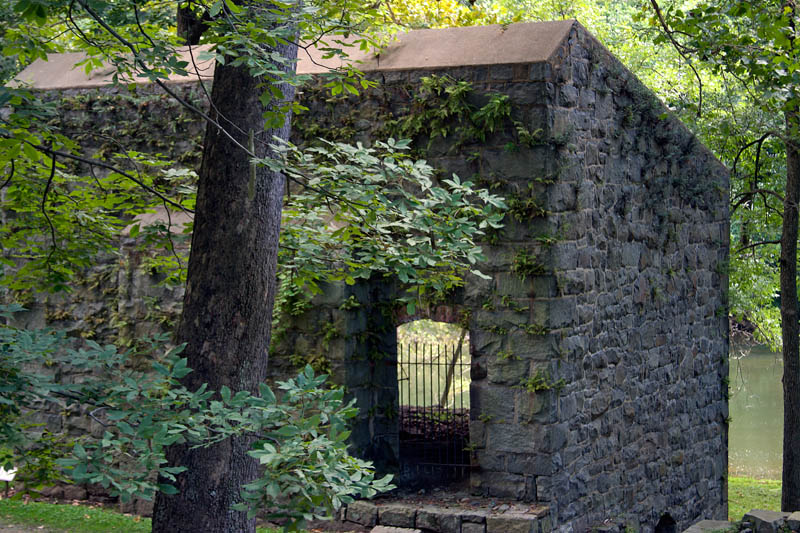
Unrestored Gunpowder Mill at Hagley Museum and Library

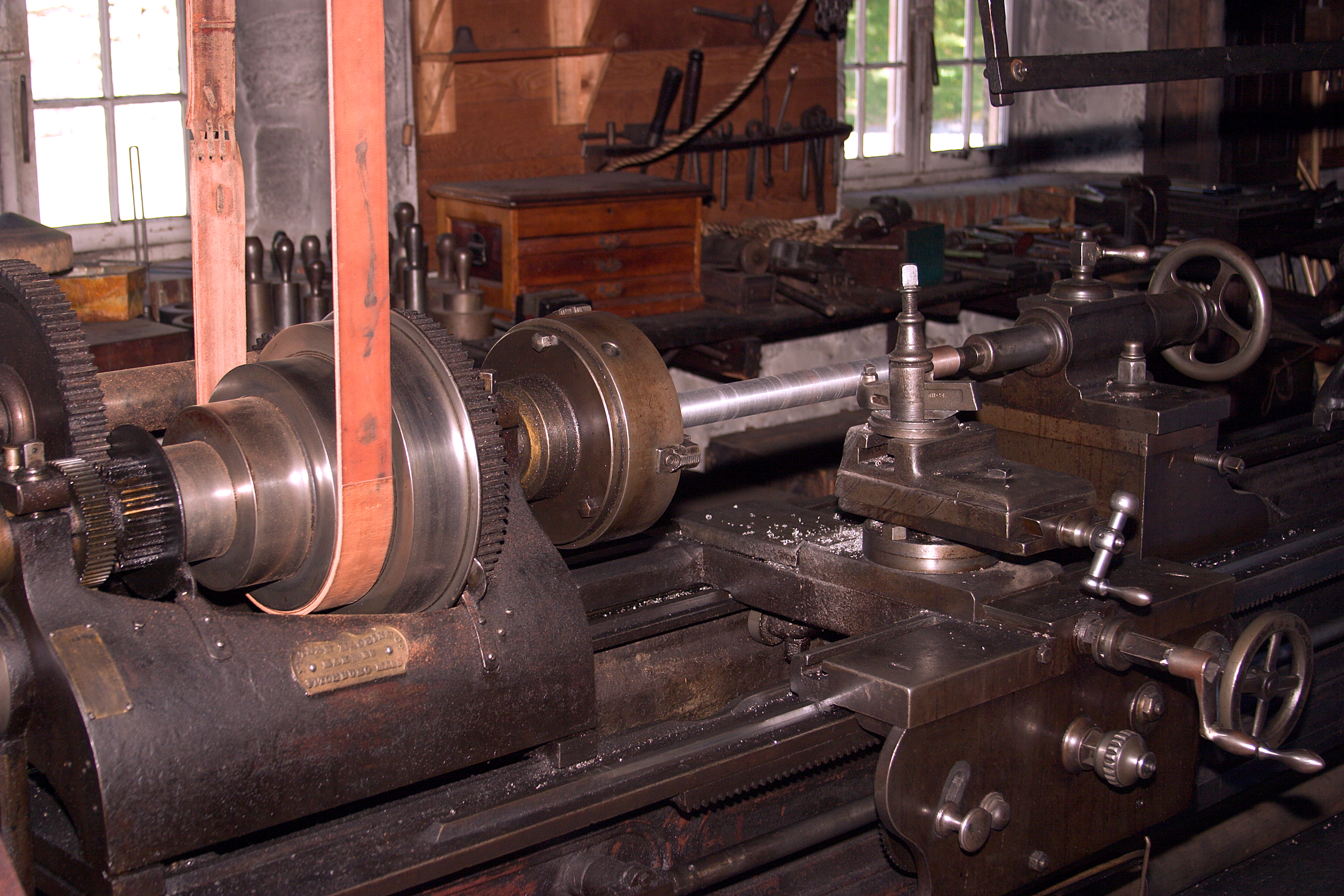
Machinery in Hagley Museum's workshop

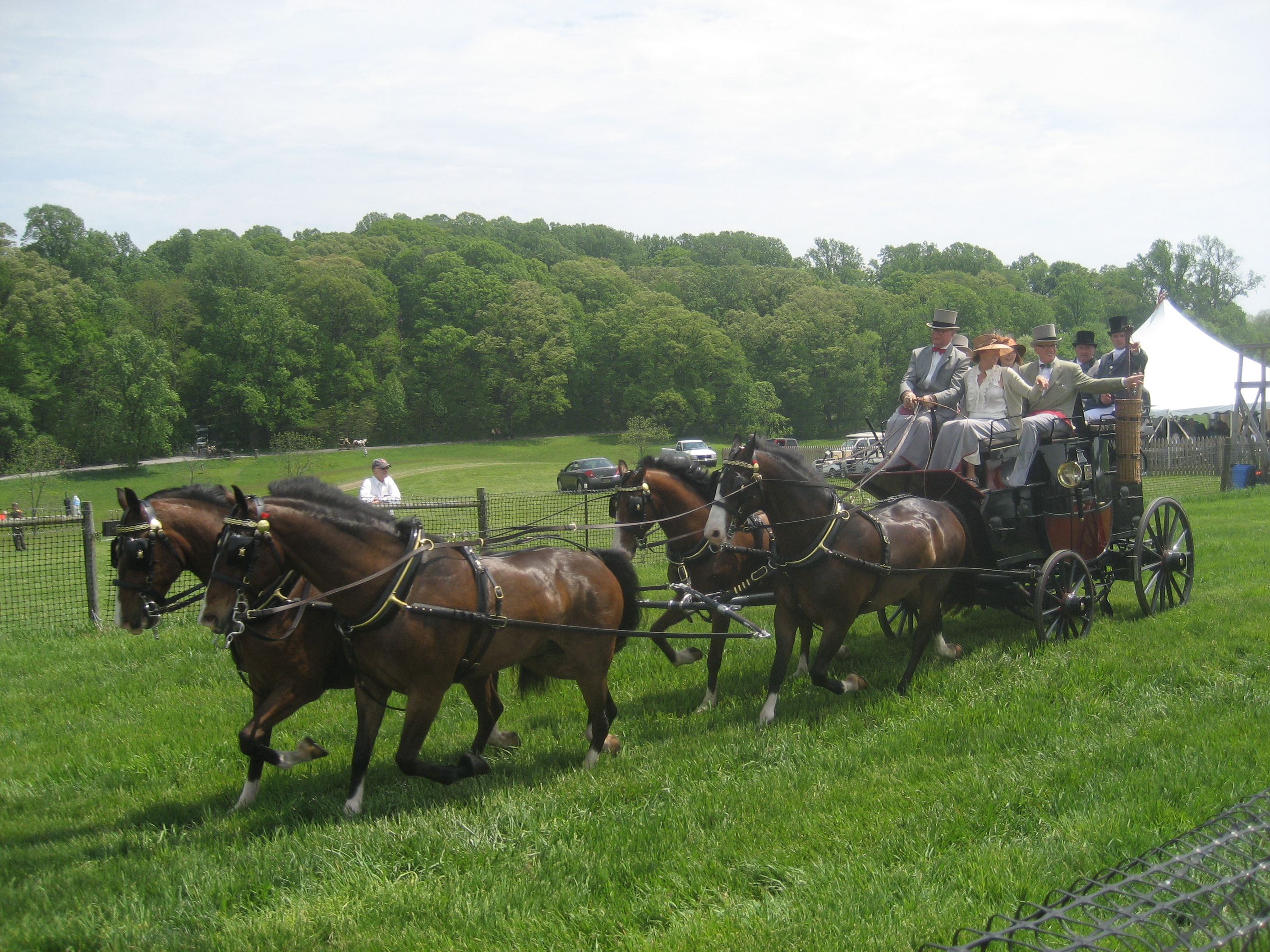
Frolic Weymouth driving his coach at the head of Winterthur’s Point-to-Point carriage parade.

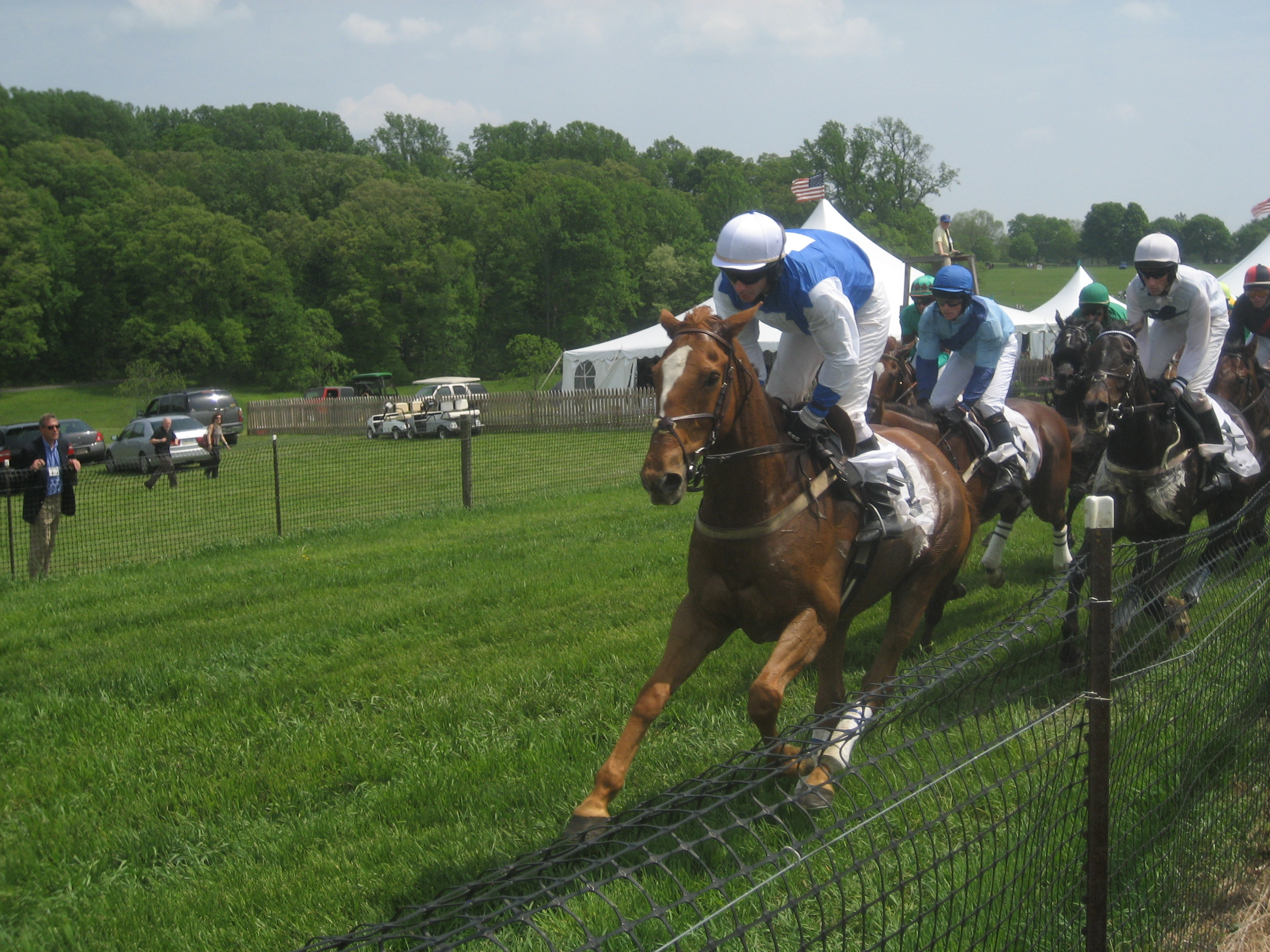
Steeplechase at Winterthur’s Point-to-Point.

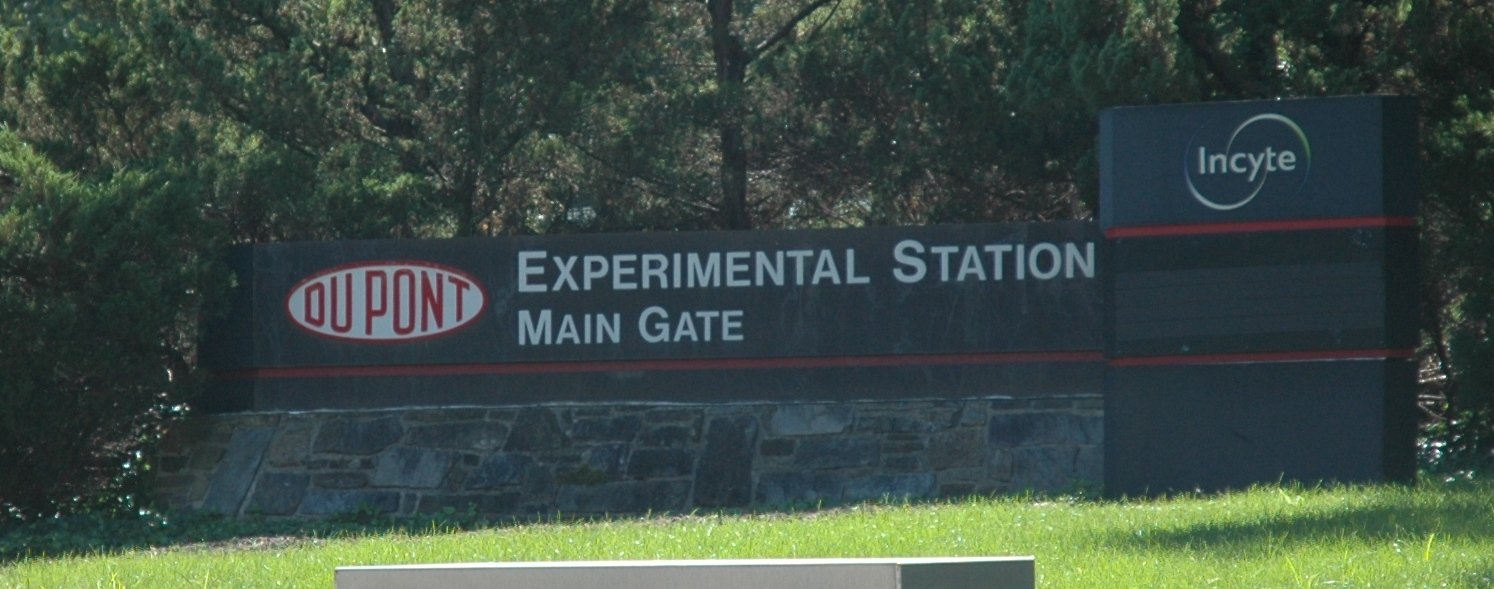
Main entrance to the DuPont Experimental Station at the Tyler McConnell Bridge spanning Brandywine Creek

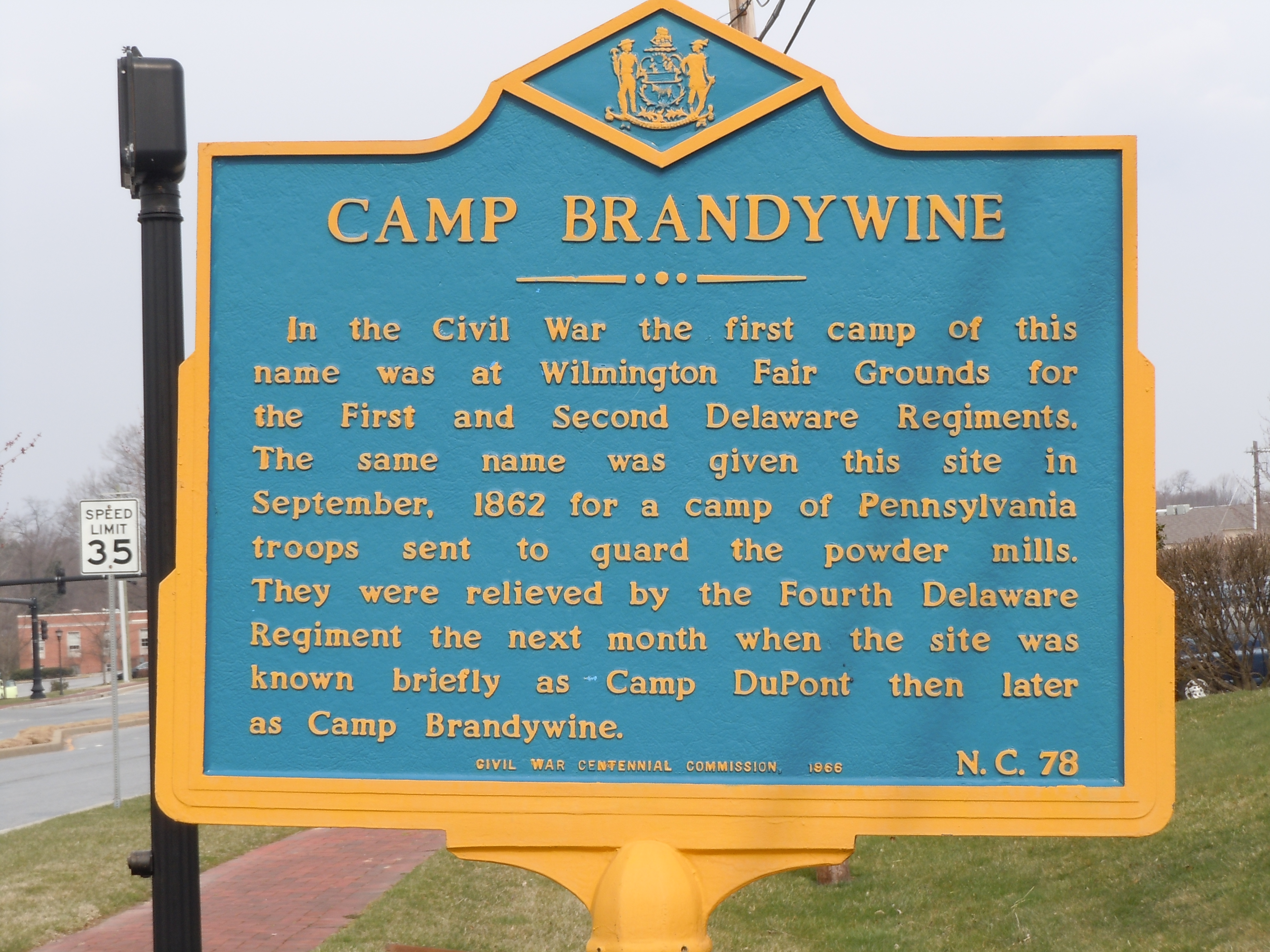
Camp Brandywine historic marker in Greenville, Delaware

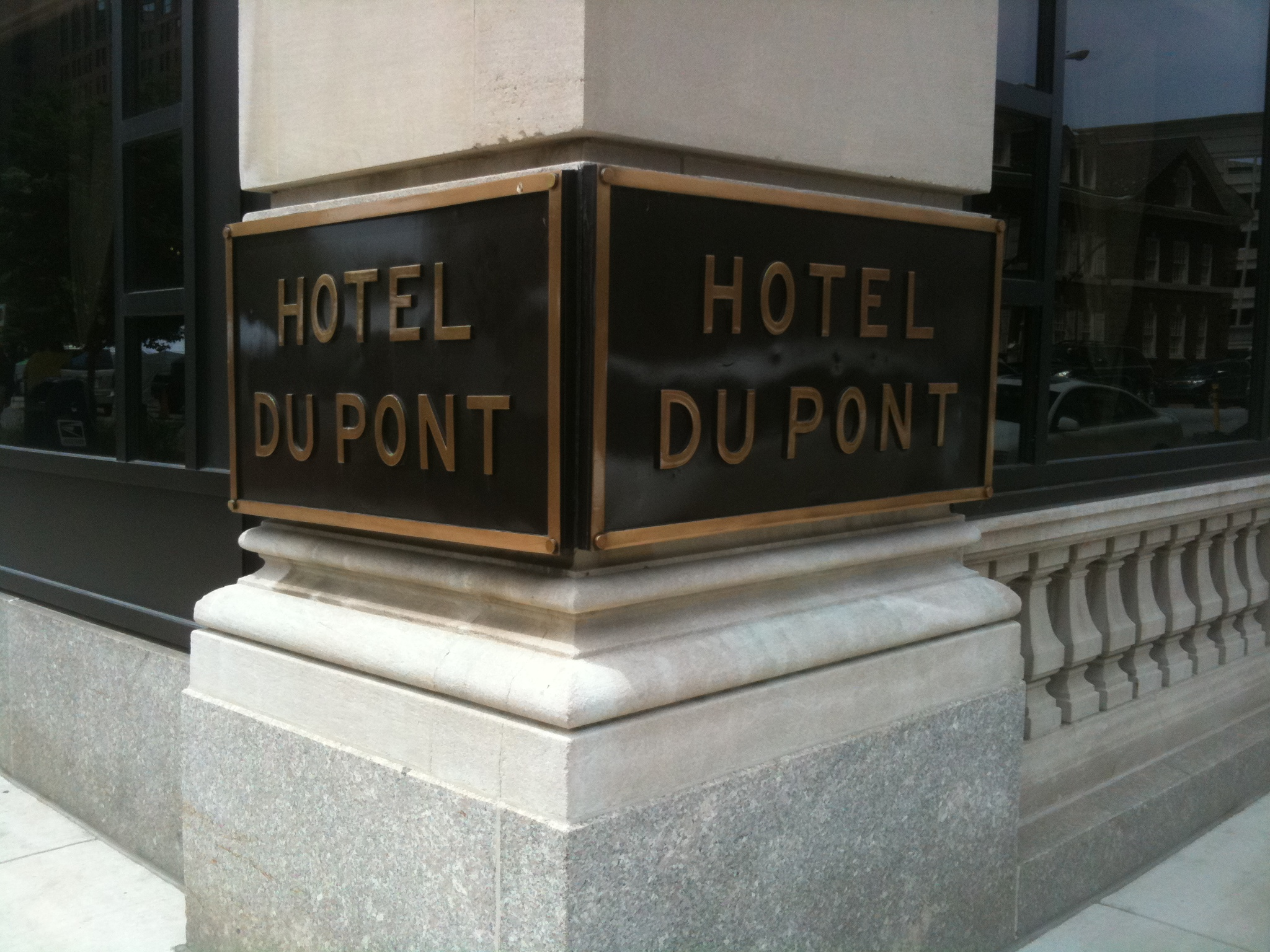
Hotel DuPont cornerstone

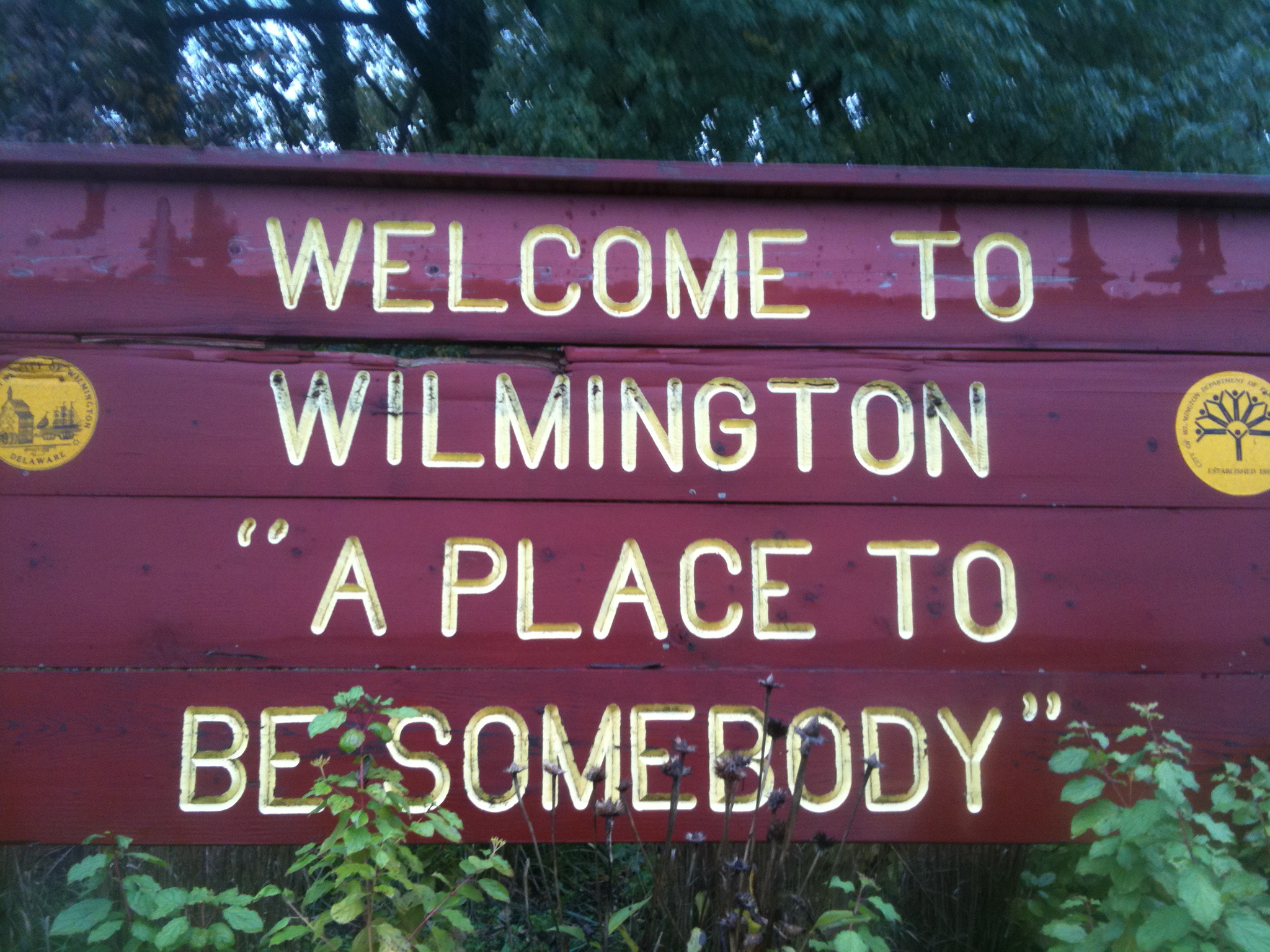
Wilmington: A Place to Be Somebody
