= List of DuPont Experimental Station inventions =

Coordinates: 39°46′26″N 75°34′19″W

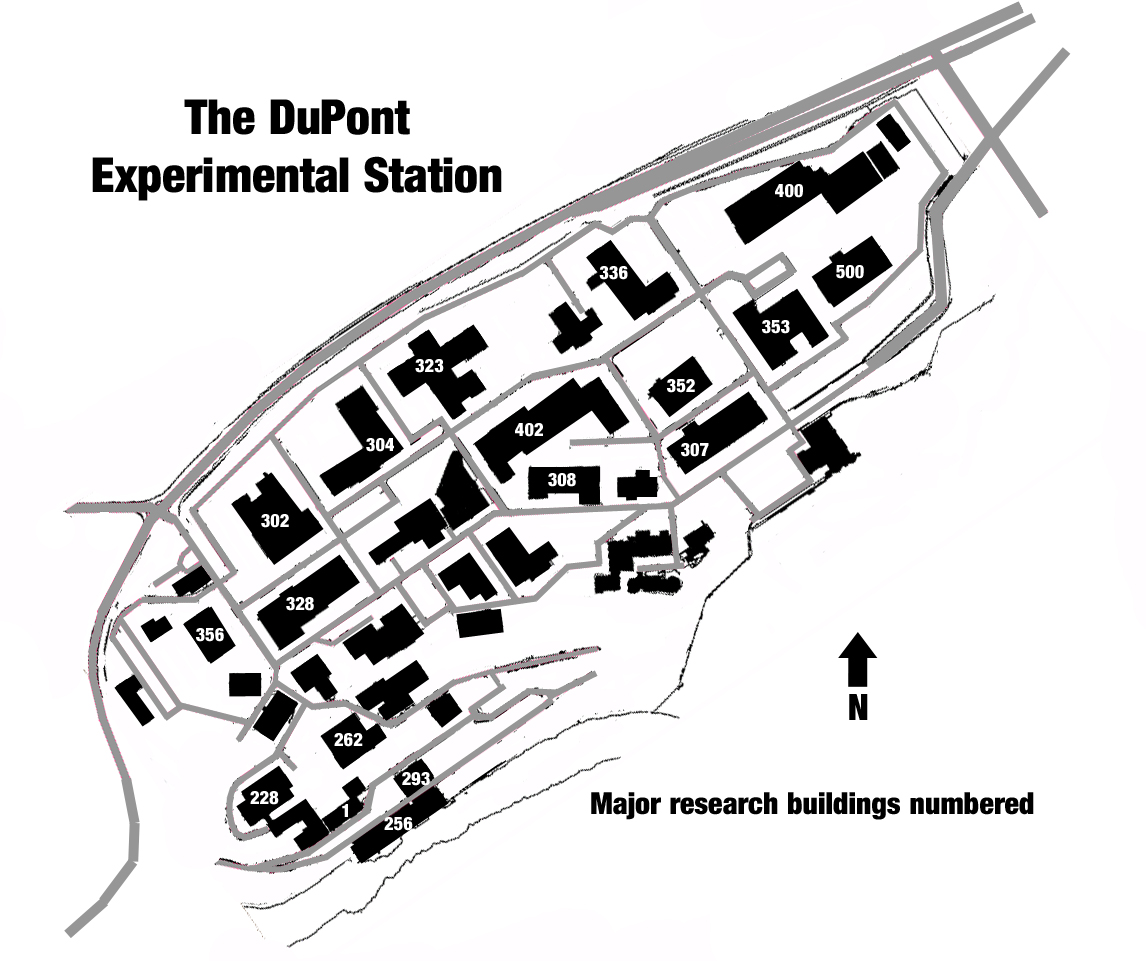
Map of the DuPont Experimental Station in Wilmington, DE showing the major research buildings.

The DuPont Experimental Station is the main research and development site of DuPont and Chemours, located along Delaware Route 141. The site map is shown in the Figure and the buildings are numbered. The map is not fixed in time in that not all of the building shown existed in the same time frame. Some were demolished before other were built.

The site was initiated along the banks of the Brandywine River so the lowest numbers are in the lower left of the map. Expansion has taken place toward the upper right, slowly displacing the DuPont Country Club, so those are the more modern buildings and the more recent history of the site. Each of the business units of the company have had research facilities at the Experimental Station, so the inventions listed below reflect the nature of the research carried out in each building.

== By building ==
Building 1

Alkyd resins for automotive finishes

Building 228

Nylon polyamide synthetic polymers

Polyvinyl chloride development

Polyethylene terephthalate development

Neoprene, the world's first synthetic rubber

Dacron polyester Polyethylene terephthalate fibers

Teflon Polytetrafluoroethylene dispersions

2,4-d 2,4-Dichlorophenoxyacetic acid herbicides

Sulfonylurea herbicides and preemergent herbicides

Ludox colloidal silica

Vazo free radical initiators

The Bunker (building number not recorded)

Though it is not shown on the map, there was an underground bunker between buildings 228 and 262. That bunker housed a shooting range that was used to test DuPont powders and other explosives. In later years, it housed a golf ball cannon and high speed photography equipment to measure the Coefficient of Restitution of golf balls made with various DuPont elastomers.

Building 256

Surlyn ionomeric resins

Teflon FEP Fluorinated ethylene propylene

Elvax ethylene vinyl acetate copolymers

Elvaloy copolymers http://www2.dupont.com/Elvaloy/en_US/

Nafion fluorinated ionomers

Vespel SP polyimide parts

Building 262

Nylon and polyester process development

Chlorofluorocarbon alternatives

Butane to intermediates for Lycra Spandex

Building 293

Kapton polyimide films

Building 302

Kevlar high-strength fibers for body armor

Nomex flame-resistant fibers

Lycra spandex fibers

Tyvek spun-bonded olefin housewrap and envelopes

Orlon acrylic fiber

Building 304

Polyethylene terephthalate PET bottles

Thomas H. Chilton's unit operations for chemical engineering

Solamet PV17x, PV18x, PV19x, and PV20x photovoltaic metallization pastes

Building 307

Qualicon Bax riboprinter to ensure food safety

Building 320

Suva HCFC refrigerants

Building 323

Hypalon chlorosulfonated polyethylene synthetic rubber

Elvacite

Elvamide nylon multipolymer resins

Butacite polyvinyl butyral for laminated safety glass

Selar RB hydrocarbon barrier nylon resins

Minlon mineral-reinforced nylon engineering resins

Supertough high-impact nylon

Supertough Delrin® polyoxymethylene engineering resin

DuPont's glass reinforced nylon

Zenite liquid crystal polymers

Zytel Thermoplastic Polyamides

Building 328

Nylon intermediates

TiPure Titanium dioxide process

Ink jet ink technology

H_{2}SO_{4} process

New Harvest omega-3 fatty acid supplements

Sorona polyester

Hylamer UHMW polyethylene for joint replacements

Building 352

Riston photoresists for printed circuit boards

Cyrel digital flexography for printing

Building 353

Nordel EPDM rubber

Hytrel thermoplastic elastomer

Viton fluoroelastomer

Kalrez perfluoroelastomer

Vamac ethylene acrylic elastomer

Nobel Prize work on crown ethers by Charles J. Pedersen

Plenish high oleic acid soybean oil

Building 356

Potassium titanyl phosphate frequency doubling crystals for eye and prostate surgery, and green laser pointers

Cronex X-ray image intensifier phosphors and screens

Building 400

Hyzaar combination drug to treat hypertension

Cozaar Losartan angiotensin II receptor antagonist to treat hypertension

Sustiva Efavirenz reverse transcriptase inhibitor for human immunodeficiency virus HIV

Building 402

Reliance herbicides

Londax Preemergent herbicides

Glean herbicides

Accent post-emergent corn herbicide

Plenish high oleic acid soybeans

Building 500

Built for DuPont Pharmaceuticals, Building 500 is the newest building on site, and was instrumental in the development of Solamet PV17x, PV18x, PV19x, and PV20x photovoltaic metallization pastes
