= DuPont Experimental Station =

Research and development facility of DuPont

Coordinates: 39°46′26″N 75°34′19″W

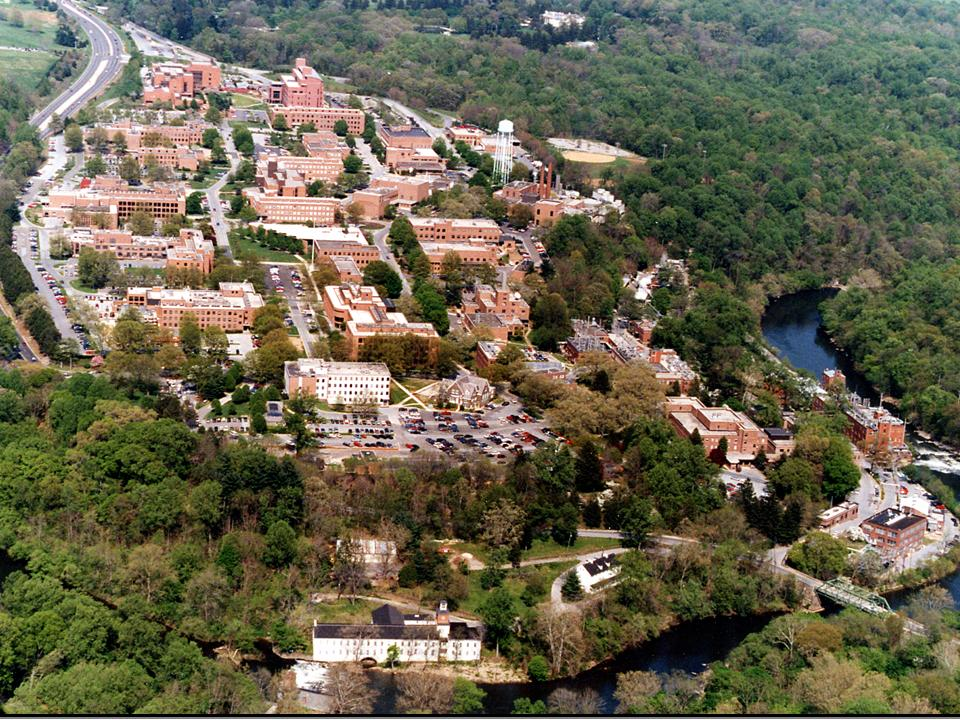
Aerial photo of the Dupont Experimental Station in the summer of 1997. The Brandywine Creek is in the immediate foreground and right. The stone building in the center of the picture is the original clubhouse of the Dupont Country Club which has now been displaced to the upper left of the photo. The Nemours Mansion and Gardens is seen in the upper center. Hagley Museum is off the picture to the immediate left.

The DuPont Experimental Station is the largest research and development facility of DuPont, located on the banks of the Brandywine Creek in Wilmington, Delaware.

On the morning of January 24, 2007, President George W. Bush became the first US president to visit the Experimental Station.

As of 2025, the Experimental Station hosts multiple industrial tenants including DuPont, Chemours, Qnity Electronics, IFF, and Celanese, as well as the Innovation Space, an incubator for chemical and biotech startups.

== Overview ==
The DuPont Experimental Station was founded as an effort to move the DuPont Company from gunpowder and explosives into chemistry.^{[1]} The site overlooks the original powder mills upon which the company was founded – now Hagley Museum and Library. The Experimental Station is located east from Hagley Museum and west-southwest from Nemours Children's Hospital, Delaware. The station serves as the primary research and development facility for DuPont. It is home to DuPont's leveraged engineering and analytical teams, and both business units of DuPont are also represented on site. The Experimental Station is where many materials and products were developed by DuPont, including:

- Neoprene – the world's first synthetic rubber
- Nylon polyamide for fibers and engineering polymers for machine parts, gears, electrical systems and automobile air intake manifolds
- Tyvek nonwovens for housewrap, envelopes, medical packaging, environmental protection and currency
- Kevlar fiber for body armor and automobile tire reinforcement;
- Mylar polyester film for packaging material and balloons
- Corian solid surface materials for countertops, flooring and art.
- Butacite polyvinyl butyral, the safety interlayer in laminated glass
- Nomex fiber for firefighting equipment and other thermal protection applications
- Simple crown ethers, which were invented by Charles J. Pedersen in 1967, and for which he won a Nobel Prize in 1987
- Herbicides of plant hormone

== See also ==
- List of DuPont Experimental Station Inventions
