= Secret treaty =

Treaties between sovereign states hidden from public knowledge

A secret treaty is a treaty (international agreement) in which the contracting state parties have agreed to conceal the treaty's existence or substance from other states and the public. Such a commitment to keep the agreement secret may be contained in the instrument itself or in a separate agreement.

According to one compilation of secret treaties published in 2004, there have been 593 secret treaties negotiated by 110 countries and independent political entities since the year 1521. Secret treaties were highly important in the balance of power diplomacy of 18th and 19th century Europe, but are rare today.

Secret treaties have been prevalent in authoritarian states where rulers use the treaties to suppress domestic opposition and unrest.

== History ==
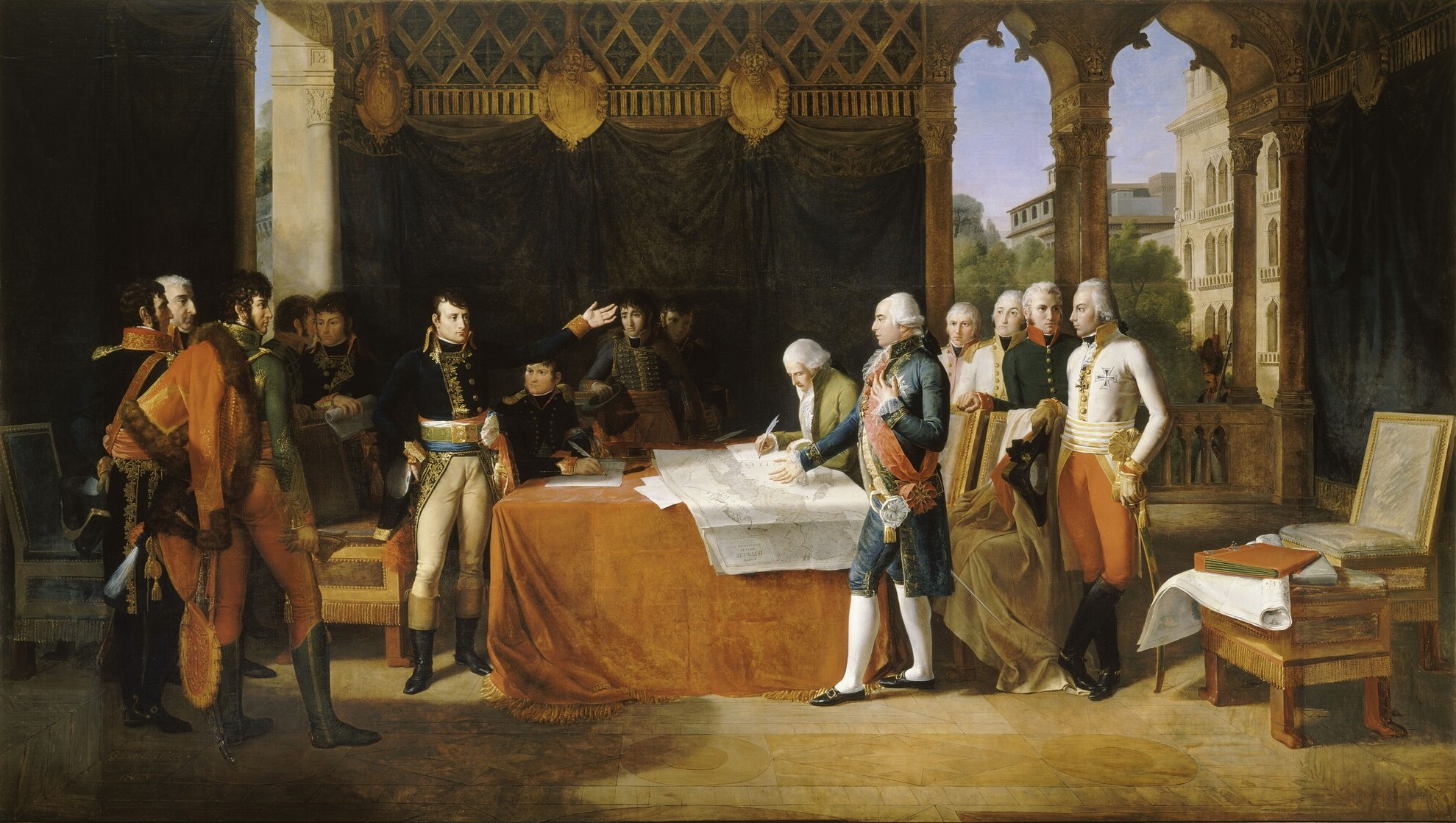
The 1797 signing of the Peace of Leoben which contained nine public articles and eleven secret ones

The "elaborate alliance systems" among European powers, "each secured by a network of secret treaties, financial arrangements, and 'military understandings'", are commonly cited as one of the causes of World War I. For example, the Reinsurance Treaty of June 1887 between Germany and Russia, which was negotiated by German Chancellor Otto von Bismarck for Germany to avoid a two-front war, was a "highly secret treaty" in which the two powers pledged a three-year period to remain neutral if the other became involved in a war with a third country unless Germany attacked Russia's longstanding ally, France, or Russia attacked Germany's longstanding ally, Austria-Hungary.

The use of "secret agreements and undertakings between several allies or between one state and another" continued throughout World War I. Some of them were irreconcilably inconsistent, "leaving a bitter legacy of dispute" at the end of the war. Some important secret treaties of the era include the one for the German–Ottoman alliance, which was concluded in Constantinople on August 2, 1914. That treaty provided that Germany and Turkey would remain neutral in the conflict between Austria-Hungary and Serbia, but if Russia intervened "with active military measures", both countries would become military allies. Another important secret treaty was the Treaty of London, concluded on April 26, 1915, in which Italy was promised certain territorial concessions in exchange for joining the war on the Triple Entente (Allied) side. Another secret treaty was the Treaty of Bucharest, concluded between Romania and the Triple Entente powers (Britain, France, Italy, and Russia) on August 17, 1916 in which Romania pledged to attack Austria-Hungary and not to seek a separate peace in exchange for certain territorial gains. Article 16 of that treaty provided, "The present arrangement shall be held secret."

== Early efforts at reform ==
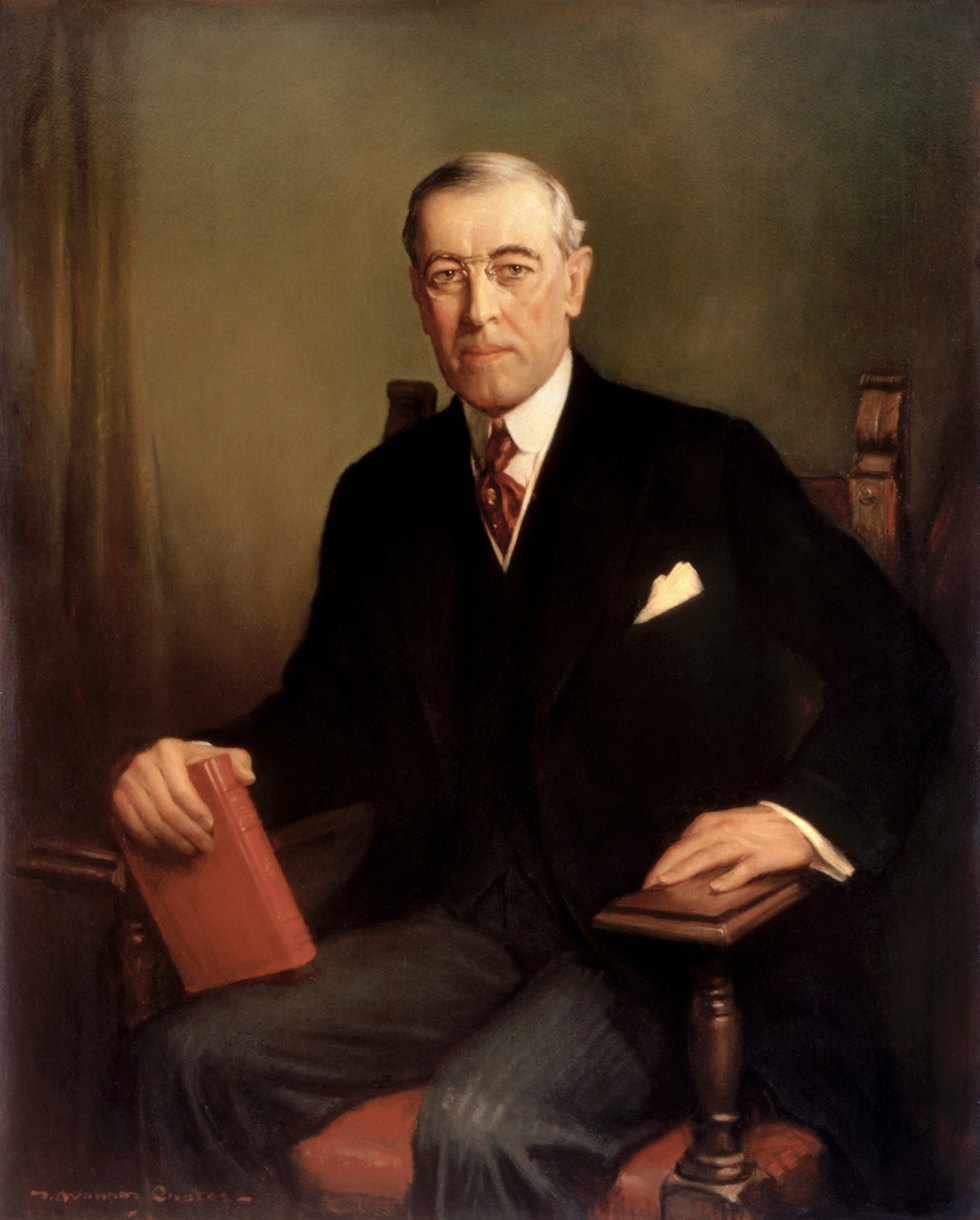
US President Woodrow Wilson was an avowed opponent of secret diplomacy.

After the outbreak of World War I, public opinion in many countries demanded more open diplomacy. After the October Revolution brought the Bolsheviks to power in Russia in November 1917, Leon Trotsky published the secret treaties that the Tsarist government had made with the Entente powers, including the Treaty of London and the Constantinople Agreement. He proposed the abolition of secret diplomacy. That move caused international embarrassment and "a strong, sustained reaction against secret diplomacy".

US President Woodrow Wilson was an opponent of secret diplomacy and viewed it as a threat to peace. He made the abolition of secret diplomacy the first point of his Fourteen Points, set forth in a speech to Congress, on January 8, 1918, after the country had entered the war. Wilson "dissociated the United States from the Allies' earlier secret commitments and sought to abolish them forever once the war had been won". The Fourteen Points were based on a draft paper prepared by Walter Lippmann and his colleagues on the Inquiry, Isaiah Bowman, Sidney Mezes, and David Hunter Miller. Lippmann's draft was a direct response to the secret treaties, which Lippman had been shown by Secretary of War Newton D. Baker. Lippman's task was "to take the secret treaties, analyze the parts which were tolerable, and separate them from those which we regarded as intolerable, and then develop a position which conceded as much to the Allies as it could, but took away the poison. ... It was all keyed upon the secret treaties. That's what decided what went into the Fourteen Points."

Wilson repeated his Fourteen Points at the Paris Peace Conference, where he proposed a commitment to "open covenants ... openly arrived at" and the elimination of "private international understandings of any kind [so that] diplomacy shall proceed always frankly and in the public view". The Wilsonian position was codified in Article 18 of the Covenant of the League of Nations, which mandated that all League of Nations members states register every treaty or international agreement with the League secretariat and that no treaty was binding unless so registered. That led to the rise of the treaty registration system "although not every treaty that would have been subject to registration was duly registered".

=== League of Nations era ===
In 1935, Italy was determined to annex Abyssinia (now Ethiopia), and the League attempted to mediate between the two countries with little success. In December 1935, British Foreign Secretary Samuel Hoare made a secret plan with French Prime Minister Pierre Laval outside of the League of Nations and concluded the Hoare–Laval Pact to give away most of Abyssinia to Italy. Two months later, news leaked out about the Hoare–Laval Pact, and Hoare resigned from the Cabinet amid public opposition to appeasement. The episode severely damaged the reputation of the League, which showed that it could not serve as an effective channel for the adjudication of international disputes.

One of the most infamous secret treaties in history was the Additional Secret Protocol to the Molotov–Ribbentrop Pact of August 23, 1939 between the Soviet Union and Nazi Germany, which was negotiated by Soviet Foreign Minister Vyacheslav Molotov and German Foreign Minister Joachim von Ribbentrop. The pact itself, a ten-year non-aggression agreement, was public, but the Additional Secret Protocol, superseded by a similar secret protocol, the German-Soviet Frontier Treaty, the next month, carved up spheres of influence in Eastern Europe between Nazi Germany and the Soviet Union and placed Finland, Estonia, Latvia, Bessarabia (part of Romania), and eastern Poland in the Soviet sphere and western Poland and Lithuania in the German sphere. The existence of the secret protocol was not confirmed until 1989. When it became public, it caused outrage in the Baltic states although they had suspected its existence.

The percentages agreement was a secret pact between Soviet Premier Joseph Stalin and British Prime Minister Winston Churchill during the Fourth Moscow Conference in October 1944 on how to divide various European countries among the leaders' respective spheres of influence. The agreement was officially made public by Churchill twelve years later in the final volume of his memoir of the Second World War.

== Decline in modern times ==
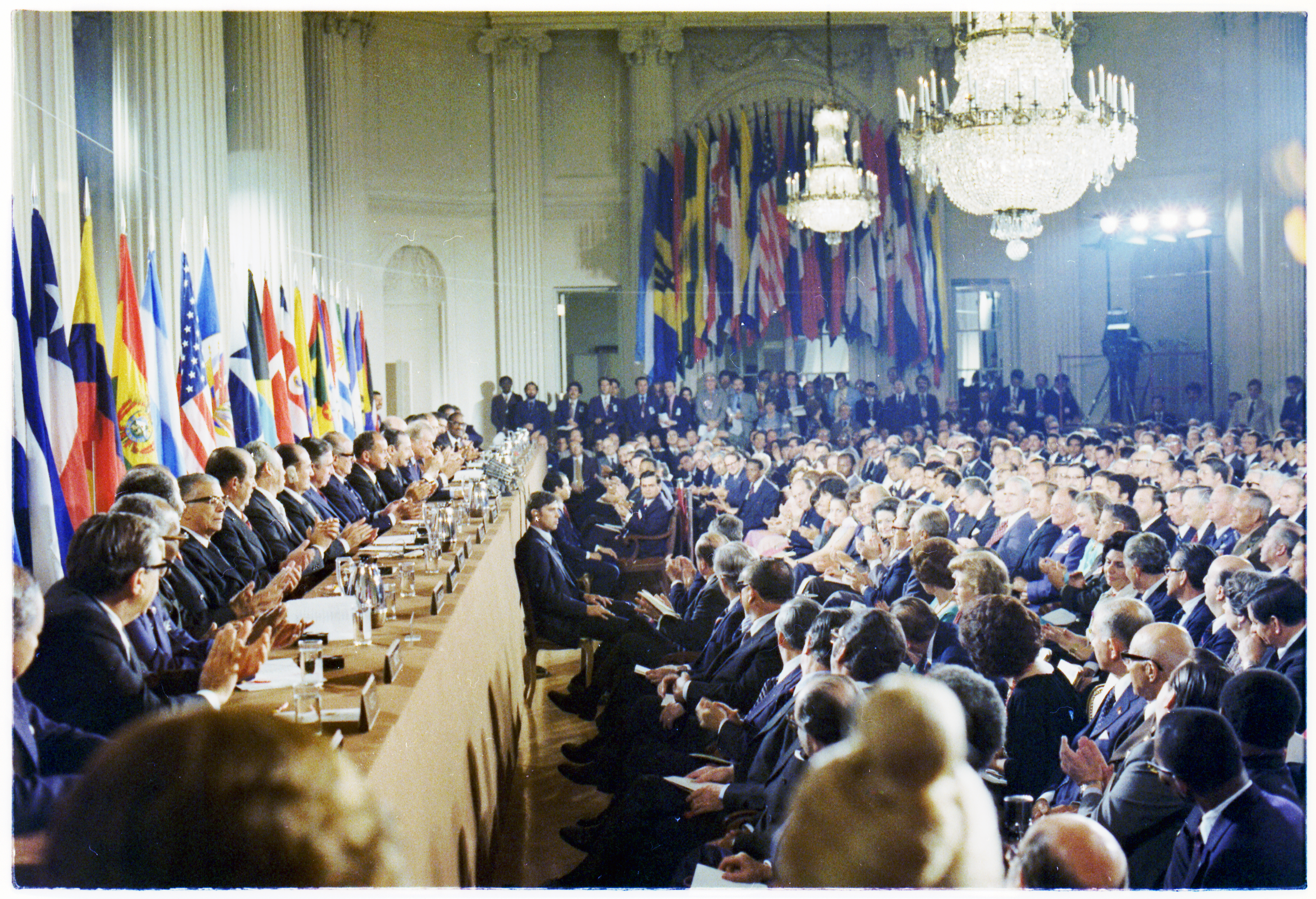
The Panama Canal treaties being signed in 1977 in front of gathered media and government officials

After World War II, the registration system that had begun with the League of Nations was continued through the United Nations. Article 102 of the Charter of the United Nations, based on Article 18 of the Covenant of the League of Nations, provides that:

1. Every treaty and every international agreement entered into by any Member of the United Nations after the present Charter comes into force shall as soon as possible be registered with the Secretariat and published by it.
2. No party to any such treaty or international agreement which has not been registered in accordance with the provisions of paragraph 1 of this Article may invoke that treaty or agreement before any organ of the United Nations.

Similarly, Article 80 of the Vienna Convention on the Law of Treaties (which entered into force in 1980) requires a party to the convention to register any treaty to which it is a party once the treaty enters into force.

Over the years, the UN has developed an extensive treaty-registration system, detailed in its Repertory of Practice and Treaty Handbook. From December 1946 through July 2013, the United Nations Secretariat recorded over 200,000 treaties published in the United Nations Treaty Series pursuant to Article 102 of the UN Charter. Still, today "a substantial number of treaties are not registered, mainly due to practical reasons, such as the administrative or ephemeral charter of some treaties". Non-registered treaties are not necessarily secret, since such treaties are often published elsewhere.

Some true secret treaties still exist, however, mostly in the context of agreements to establish foreign military bases. For example, after the 1960 Security Treaty between the U.S. and Japan, the two nations entered into three agreements that (according to an expert panel convened by the Japanese Foreign Ministry) could be defined as secret treaties, at least in a broad sense. These agreements involved the transit and storage of nuclear weapons by U.S. forces in Japan despite Japan's formal non-nuclear weapons policy. Prior to their public release in 2010, the Japanese government had gone so far as convicting journalist Nishiyama Takichi, who tried to expose one treaty, for espionage. Operation Condor was a secret treaty between the US and five South American nations to coordinate counter-insurgency and "dirty war" against communist rebels and other leftists in Latin America.

According to Dörr & Schmalenbach's commentary on the Vienna Convention on the Law of Treaties, "the fact that today secret treaties do not play an essential role is less a result of [Article 102 of the UN Charter] than of an overall change in the conduct of international relations".

According to Charles Lipson:

there are powerful reasons why secret treaties are rare today. The first and most fundamental is the rise of democratic states with principles of public accountability and some powers of legislative oversight. Secret treaties are difficult to reconcile with these democratic procedures. The second reason is that ever since the United States entered World War I, it has opposed secret agreements as a matter of basic principle and has enshrined its position in the peace settlements of both world wars.

The decline of centralized foreign policy institutions, which worked closely with a handful of political leaders, sharply limits the uses of secret treaties. Foreign ministries no longer hold the same powers to commit states to alliances, to shift those alliance, to divide conquered territory, and to hide such critical commitments from public view. The discretionary powers of a Bismark or Metternich have no equivalent in modern Western states.

With private international understandings "virtually eliminated" among democratic states, informal agreements "live on as their closest modern substitutes".

== Secrecy of international negotiations ==
Secret treaties (in which the agreement itself is secret) are distinct from secret negotiations (in which the ongoing negotiations are confidential, but the final agreement is public). Colin Warbrick writes that in Britain, "the prerogative power to negotiate and conclude treaties puts the government in a powerful position. It does not need to seek a negotiating mandate from Parliament and can keep its positions confidential until the conclusion of negotiations." The traditional rule in favor of secrecy of negotiations is in tension with values of transparency: Anne Peters writes that "the growing significance of multilateral treaties as global ... instruments invites a readjustment of the relative weight accorded to the values of discreteness and confidentiality of diplomatic treaty negotiations ... on one hand, and the interests of third parties and the global public on the other hand." The secrecy of negotiations for free trade agreements such as the Trans-Pacific Partnership and the Anti-Counterfeiting Trade Agreement have been politically controversial, with some commentators favoring greater transparency and others emphasizing the need for confidentiality.

== See also ==
- Secret law
