= Grand Ridge =

Grand Ridge can refer to some places in the United States:

- Grand Ridge, Florida
- Grand Ridge, Illinois
