= American Commission to Negotiate Peace =

Delegation to the Paris Peace Conference (1919)

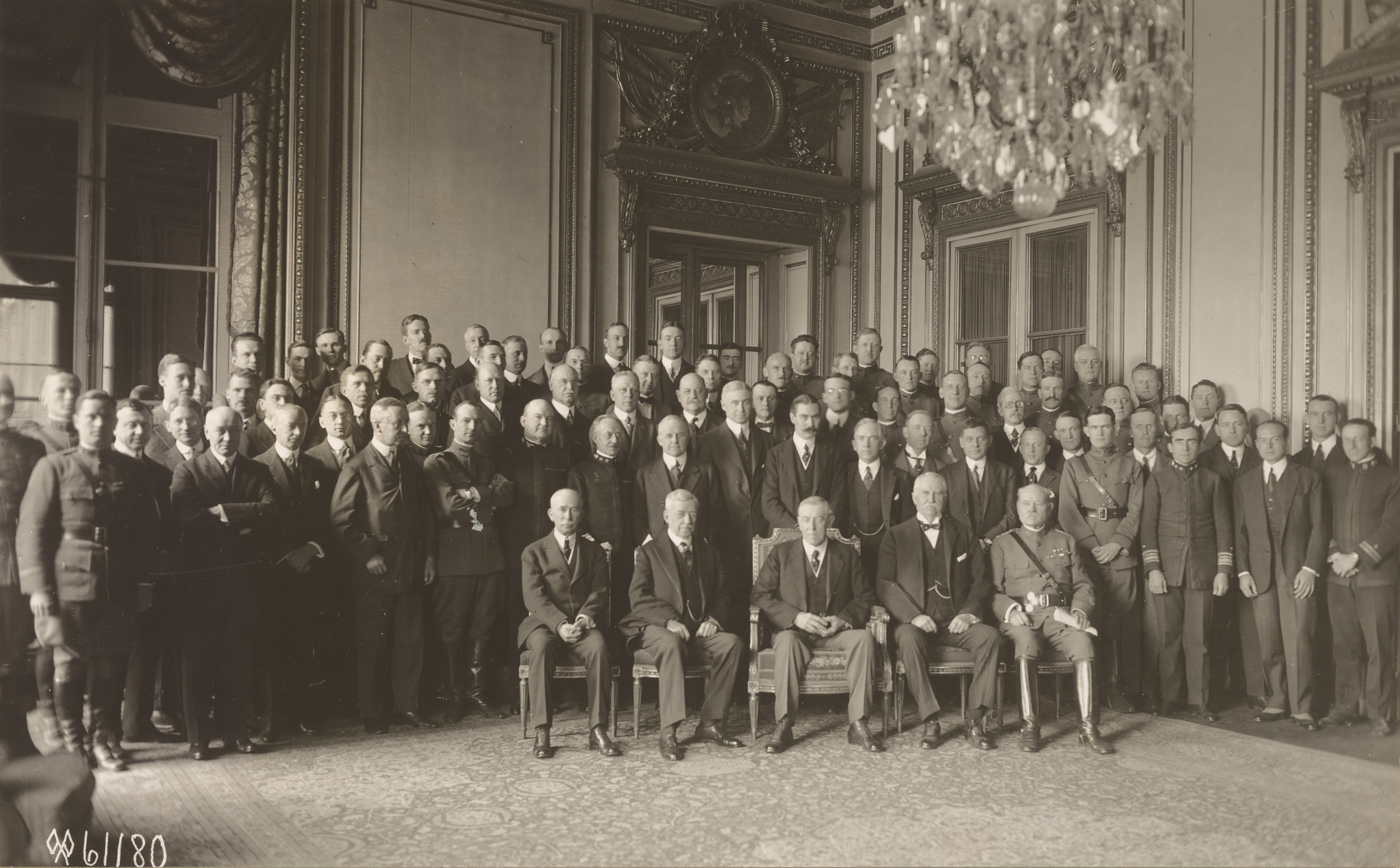
Commissioners and staff of the American Commission to Negotiate Peace in Paris on June 25, 1919 (President Wilson seated at center of front row)

The American Commission to Negotiate Peace, successor to The Inquiry, participated in the peace negotiations at the Treaty of Versailles from January 18 to December 9, 1919. Frank Lyon Polk headed the commission in late 1919. The peace conference was superseded by the Council of Ambassadors (1920–1931), which was organized to deal with various political questions regarding the implementation of provisions of the Treaty, after the end of World War I. Members of the commission appointed by President Woodrow Wilson included:

== Commissioners Plenipotentiary ==
- Tasker H. Bliss
- Edward M. House, a diplomat, politician and presidential foreign policy advisor to President Wilson.
- Robert Lansing
- Henry White

== Staff Members ==
- Leonard Porter Ayres
- Bernard Baruch, chief of the Economic Section.
- George Louis Beer, colonial historian and chief of the Colonial Division.
- William S. Benson, chief of the Naval Section.
- Isaiah Bowman
- William C. Bullitt, chief of Current Intelligence Division.
- Robert Emmett Condon
- Norman H. Davis
- Clive Day, an American college professor and writer on economics history at the University of California.
- Ellis Loring Dresel, chief of Current Diplomatic and Political Correspondence Division.
- Allen W. Dulles
- John F. Dulles
- Stanley Dunbar Embick
- Donald Paige Frary, an American college professor with Yale University, an expert on International Affairs, and author; served as a secretary to Edward M. House.
- Samuel Gompers, chief of the Labor Section.
- Ulysses S. Grant III
- Cary T. Grayson, aide to President Wilson.
- Joseph C. Grew, secretary general.
- Leland B. Harrison, diplomatic secretary.
- Charles Homer Haskins
- Amos Shartle Hershey
- Christian A. Herter, assistant to Ambassador White.
- Herbert Hoover, chief of the Food Section.
- Stanley K. Hornbeck
- Manley Ottmer Hudson
- Edward N. Hurley, chief of the Shipping Section.
- Mark Jefferson
- Douglas Wilson Johnson
- Francis Joseph Kernan, chief of the Military Section.
- Alexander Comstock Kirk, assistant to Secretary of State Lansing.
- Harry Shepard Knapp
- Thomas W. Lamont
- Alexander Legge
- Vance C. McCormick, an American politician and prominent businessman from Harrisburg, Pennsylvania.
- Luke McNamee
- Sidney Edward Mezes, an American philosopher and college professor, former president of the City College of New York.
- David Hunter Miller
- Fred K. Nielsen
- Frank Herman Schofield
- James Brown Scott
- Charles Seymour, an American college professor at Yale University.
- James T. Shotwell
- Charles Pelot Summerall
- Leland L. Summers
- Frank W. Taussig
- Ralph H. Van Deman
- William Linn Westermann, then a professor at the University of Wisconsin, who later taught at Cornell and Columbia and became president of the American Historical Association. At the conference, Westermann advised on policy regarding the Near East.
- Allyn Abbott Young

== See also ==
- Paris Peace Conference, 1919
