= Grand Ridge, Florida =

Town of Grand Ridge
- Town
- Grand Ridge, Florida
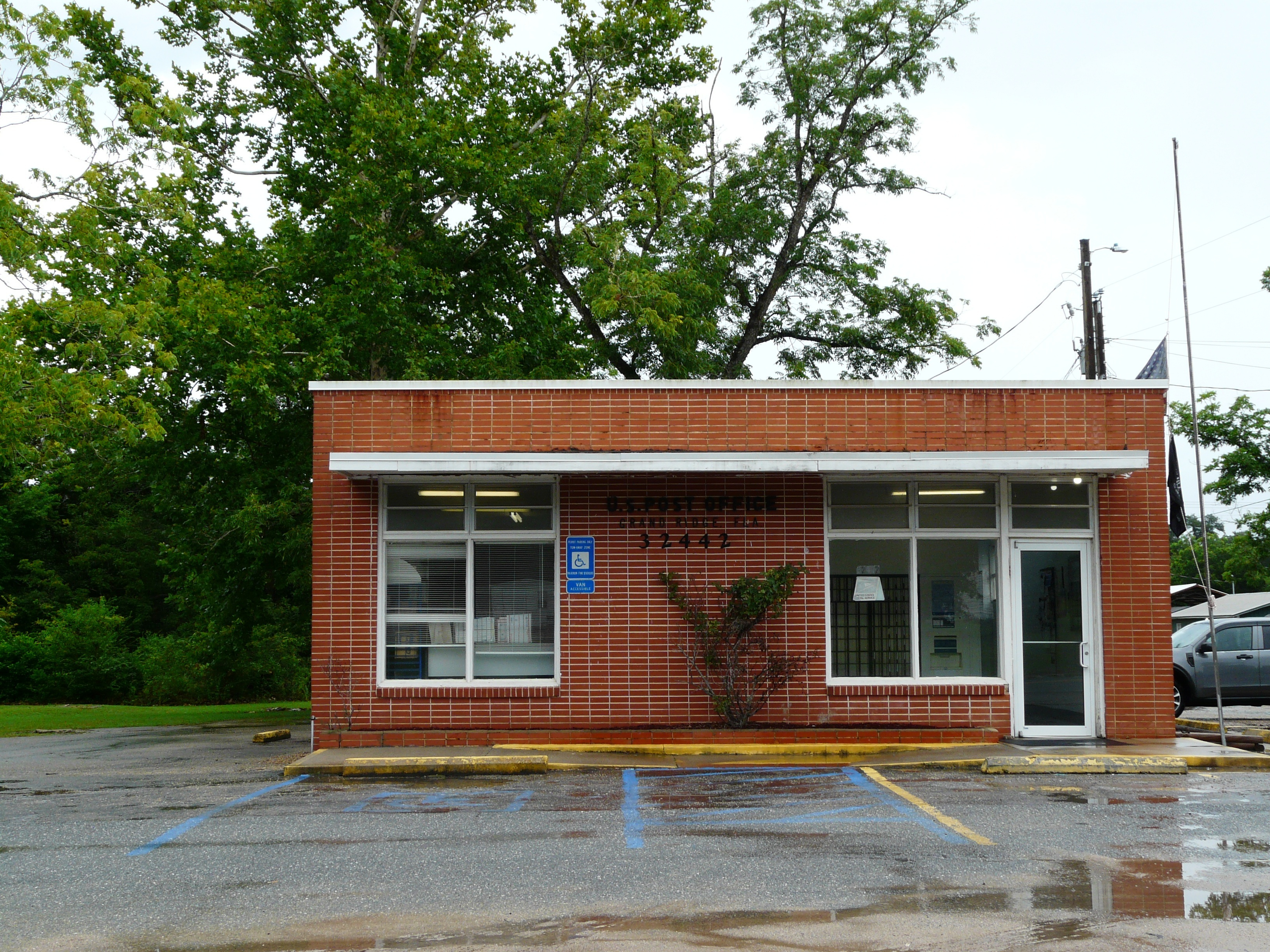
- Grand Ridge U.S. Post Office

- Location in Jackson County and the state of Florida
- Coordinates: 30°42′43″N 85°00′07″W
- Country: United States
- State: Florida
- County: Jackson
- Settled: 1881
- Incorporated: 1951
- Named after: Grand Ridge, Illinois

Government
  - Type: Council-Manager
  - Mayor: Chris Harrell
  - Councilors: Kim Applewhite, Tullis Tye, Cately Sprague, and Chris Wright Jr.
  - Town Manager: Natalie Curry
  - Town Clerk: Michelle Burnett
  - Town Attorney: A. Clay Milton

Area
  - Total: 4.52 sq mi (11.71 km^{2})
  - Land: 4.35 sq mi (11.26 km^{2})
  - Water: 0.17 sq mi (0.44 km^{2})
- Elevation: 128 ft (39 m)

Population (2020)
  - Total: 882
  - Density: 203/sq mi (78.3/km^{2})
- Time zone: UTC-6 (Central (CST))
  - Summer (DST): UTC-5 (CDT)
- ZIP code: 32442
- Area code(s): 850, 448
- FIPS code: 12-27175
- GNIS feature ID: 2406600

Grand Ridge is a town in Jackson County, Florida, United States. It is part of the Florida Panhandle and North Florida. The population was 882 at the 2020 census.

== History ==
In 1860, Judge John Thomas Porter and his wife Phoebe J. Porter (née Finley) moved from New Salem, Fayette County, Pennsylvania to Illinois with their son Ebenezer F. Porter (born 1859), close to Grand Ridge, Illinois in LaSalle County, Illinois, where they lived on a farm until 1872. Porter was at first a farmer, and afterward a lumberman and grain dealer. In 1872, he moved into Grand Ridge, Illinois proper, and built and operated two grain elevators. In 1881, he moved to Florida and engaged in the lumber business. He founded the Town of Grand Ridge, Florida, naming it in honor of his old Illinois home.

John T. Porter also owned the West Florida Echo, a newspaper in Grande Ridge. He was a Republican and it is reported as the only Republican newspaper in the northwestern panhandle of Florida at the start of the 20th century. His son Ebenezer F. Porter became a state legislator in Kansas.

The Town of Grand Ridge was officially incorporated as a municipality in 1951, despite being settled since 1881.

== Geography ==
The approximate coordinates for the Town of Grand Ridge is located in southeastern Jackson County.

U.S. Route 90 travels through the northern side of the town, leading east 11 miles (18 km) to Chattahoochee and northwest 13 miles (21 km) to Marianna, the county seat. Florida State Road 69 runs through the center of town as Porter Avenue, leading north 10 miles (16 km) to Two Egg and south 4 miles (6 km) to Interstate 10 at Exit 152.

According to the United States Census Bureau, Grand Ridge has a total area of 4.42 square miles (11.4 km^{2}), of which 4.25 square miles (11.0 km^{2}) are land and 0.17 square miles (0.44 km^{2}), or 3.85%, are water.

=== Climate ===
The climate in this area is characterized by hot, humid summers and generally mild winters. According to the Köppen climate classification, the Town of Grand Ridge has a humid subtropical climate zone (Cfa).

== Demographics ==
Historical population
Census	Pop.	Note	%±
1960	415		—
1970	512		23.4%
1980	591		15.4%
1990	536		−9.3%
2000	792		47.8%
2010	892		12.6%
2020	882		−1.1%
U.S. Decennial Census

=== 2010 and 2020 census ===
Grand Ridge racial composition (Hispanics excluded from racial categories) (NH = Non-Hispanic)
Race	Pop 2010	Pop 2020	% 2010	% 2020
White (NH)	806	725	90.36%	82.20%
Black or African American (NH)	45	101	5.04%	11.45%
Native American or Alaska Native (NH)	12	3	1.35%	0.34%
Asian (NH)	0	3	0.00%	0.34%
Pacific Islander or Native Hawaiian (NH)	0	0	0.00%	0.00%
Some other race (NH)	1	0	0.11%	0.00%
Two or more races/Multiracial (NH)	17	35	1.91%	3.97%
Hispanic or Latino (any race)	11	15	1.23%	1.70%
Total	892	882	100.00%	100.00%

As of the 2020 United States census, there were 882 people, 359 households, and 229 families residing in the town.

As of the 2010 United States census, there were 892 people, 277 households, and 203 families residing in the town.

=== 2000 census ===
As of the census of 2000, there were 792 people, 309 households, and 232 families residing in the town. The population density was 364.8 inhabitants per square mile (140.9/km^{2}). There were 344 housing units at an average density of 158.4 per square mile (61.2/km^{2}). The racial makeup of the town was 93.56% White, 2.53% African American, 2.27% Native American, 0.13% Pacific Islander, 0.76% from other races, and 0.76% from two or more races. Hispanic or Latino of any race were 1.26% of the population.

In 2000, there were 309 households, out of which 35.9% had children under the age of 18 living with them, 59.9% were married couples living together, 13.6% had a female householder with no husband present, and 24.6% were non-families. 22.0% of all households were made up of individuals, and 8.1% had someone living alone who was 65 years of age or older. The average household size was 2.56 and the average family size was 2.95.

In 2000, in the town, the population was spread out, with 26.3% under the age of 18, 7.6% from 18 to 24, 31.2% from 25 to 44, 23.5% from 45 to 64, and 11.5% who were 65 years of age or older. The median age was 36 years. For every 100 females, there were 91.8 males. For every 100 females age 18 and over, there were 85.4 males.

In 2000, the median income for a household in the town was $31,083, and the median income for a family was $36,875. Males had a median income of $24,722 versus $20,125 for females. The per capita income for the town was $14,556. About 9.6% of families and 16.5% of the population were below the poverty line, including 26.5% of those under age 18 and 11.2% of those age 65 or over.
