= Polish Corridor =

Second Polish Republic territory between East Prussia and the rest of Germany

Coordinates: 54°21′N 18°20′E

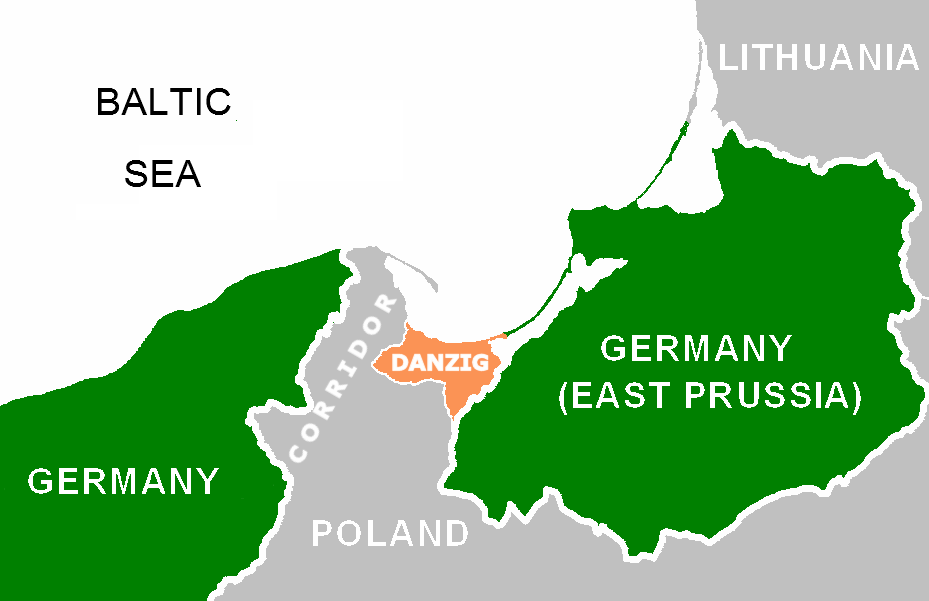
The Polish Corridor in 1923–1939

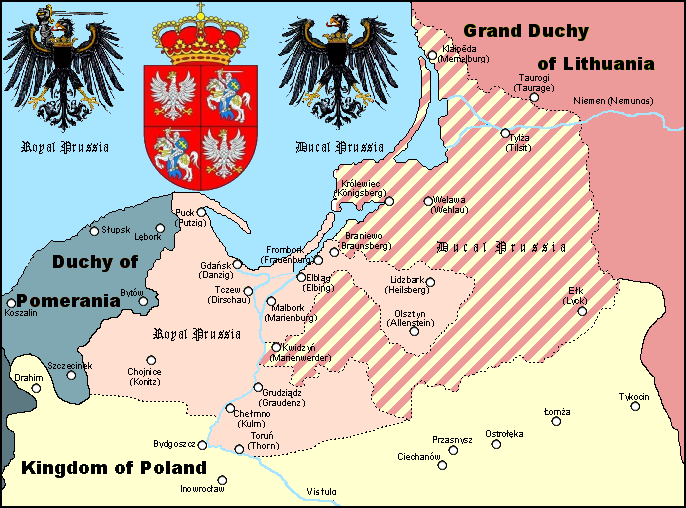
Polish Prussia in 1466–1772

Majority Polish (green) and German areas in the corridor (German 1910 census)

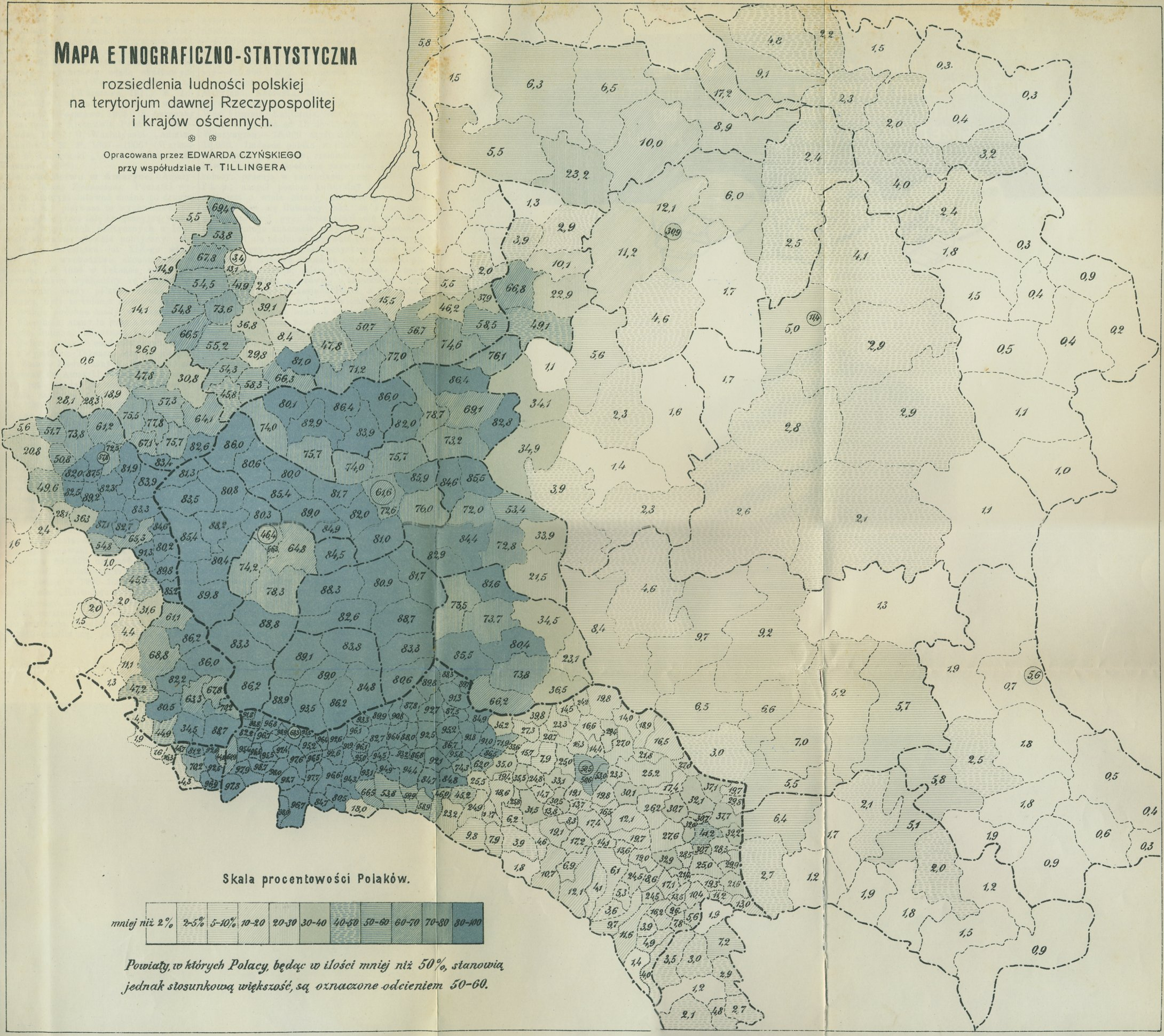
Percentage of Poles (including Kashubians) living on the former Polish–Lithuanian Commonwealth territories, c. 1900

The Polish Corridor (German: Polnischer Korridor; Polish: korytarz polski), also known as the Pomeranian Corridor, was a territory located in the region of Pomerelia (Pomeranian Voivodeship, Eastern Pomerania), which provided the Second Polish Republic with access to the Baltic Sea, thus dividing the bulk of Weimar Germany from the province of East Prussia. At its narrowest point, the Polish territory was just 30 km (19 mi) wide. The Free City of Danzig (now the Polish cities of Gdańsk, Sopot and the surrounding areas), situated to the east of the corridor, was a semi-independent German speaking city-state forming part of neither Germany nor Poland, though united with the latter through an imposed union covering customs, mail, foreign policy, railways as well as defence. It was under the protection of the League of Nations.

After Poland lost Western Pomerania to Germany in the late 13th century, the area of Eastern Pomerania with the strategically important port of Gdańsk remained a narrow strip of land giving Poland access to the Baltic Sea and was also sometimes referred to as Pomeranian corridor.

== Terminology ==
According to German historian Hartmut Boockmann the term corridor was first used by Polish politicians, while Polish historian Grzegorz Lukomski writes that the word was coined by German nationalist propaganda of the 1920s. Internationally the term was used in English as early as March 1919 and whatever its origins it became a widespread term in English.

The equivalent German term is Polnischer Korridor. Polish names include korytarz polski ('Polish corridor') and korytarz gdański ('Gdańsk corridor'); however, reference to the region as a corridor came to be regarded as offensive by interwar Polish diplomats. Among the harshest critics of the term corridor was Polish Foreign Minister Józef Beck, who in his May 5, 1939 speech in the Sejm (Polish parliament) said: "I am insisting that the term Pomeranian Voivodeship should be used. The word corridor is an artificial idea, as this land has been Polish for centuries, with a small percentage of German settlers". Poles commonly referred to the region as Pomorze Gdańskie ('Gdańsk Pomerania', Pomerelia") or simply Pomorze ('Pomerania'), or as województwo pomorskie ('Pomeranian Voivodeship'), which was the administrative name for the region.

== Background ==
=== History of the area ===
In the 10th century, Pomerelia was settled by Slavic Pomeranians, ancestors of the Kashubians, who were subdued by Bolesław I of Poland. In the 11th century, they created an independent duchy. In 1116/1121, Pomerania was again conquered by Poland. In 1138, following the death of Duke Bolesław III, Poland was fragmented into several semi-independent principalities. The Samborides, principes in Pomerelia, gradually evolved into independent dukes, who ruled the duchy until 1294. Before Pomerelia regained independence in 1227, their dukes were vassals of Poland and Denmark. Since 1308–1309, following succession wars between Poland and Brandenburg, Pomerelia was subjugated by the Monastic state of the Teutonic Knights in Prussia. In 1466, with the second Peace of Thorn, Pomerelia became part of the Polish–Lithuanian Commonwealth as a part of autonomous Royal Prussia. After the First Partition of Poland in 1772 it was annexed by the Kingdom of Prussia and named West Prussia, and became a constituent part of the new German Empire in 1871. Thus the Polish Corridor was not an entirely new creation: the territory assigned to Poland had been an integral part of Poland prior to 1772, but with a large degree of autonomy.

==== Historical population ====
Perhaps the earliest census data on the ethnic and national structure of West Prussia (including areas which later made up the corridor) is from 1819.

Ethnic/national data (Nationalverschiedenheit) for West Prussia in 1819
Ethnic or national group	Population (number)	Population (percentage)
Poles (Polen)	327,300	52%
Germans (Deutsche)	290,000	46%
Jews (Juden)	12,700	2%
Total	630,077	100%

Karl Andree, in Polen: in geographischer, geschichtlicher und culturhistorischer Hinsicht (Leipzig 1831), gives the total population of West Prussia as 700,000 – including 50% Poles (350,000), 47% Germans (330,000) and 3% Jews (20,000).

Data from the 19th century and early 20th century show the following ethnic changes in four main counties of the corridor (Puck and Wejherowo on the Baltic Sea coast; Kartuzy and Kościerzyna between the Province of Pomerania and Free City of Danzig):

The Polish Corridor: map of Puck (77.4%), Wejherowo (54.9%), Kartuzy (77.3%) and Kościerzyna (64.5%) counties, showing percentages of ethnic Poles (including Kashubians) by the end of World War I, according to the Map of Polish population published in 1919 in Warsaw

Percent of Poles and Kashubians (including Polish-German bilinguals) in four main counties of the corridor, 1831–1931
County Year	Puck (Putzig)	Wejherowo (Neustadt)	Kartuzy (Karthaus)	Kościerzyna (Berent)	Source
1831	82%		85%	72%	Jan Mordawski's estimate
1831	78%		84%	71%	Leszek Belzyt's estimate
1837	77%		84%	71%	Volkszählung census
1852	80%		77%	64%	Volkszählung
1855	80%		76%	64%	Volkszählung
1858	80%		76%	63%	Volkszählung
1861	80%		77%	64%	Belzyt
1886	75%	64%	66%	57%	Schulzählung school census
1890	69%	56%	67%	54%	Volkszählung
1890	73%	61%	68%	57%	Belzyt
1891	74%	62%	66%	56%	Schulzählung
1892	77%	67%	76%	59%	Stefan Ramułt's estimate
1896	72%	61%	70%	58%	Schulzählung
1900	69%	54%	69%	55%	Volkszählung
1901	76%	60%	71%	59%	Schulzählung
1905	70%	51%	70%	56%	Volkszählung
1906	73%	62%	72%	60%	Schulzählung
1910	70%	50%	72%	58%	Volkszählung
1910	74%	62%	74%	62%	Belzyt
1911	74%	63%	74%	63%	Schulzählung
1918	77%	55%	77%	65%	Map of Polish population
1921	89%		92%	81%	Polish General Census
1931	95%		93%	88%	Polish General Census

=== Allied plans for a corridor after World War I ===
During the First World War, both sides made bids for Polish support, and in turn Polish leaders were active in soliciting support from both sides. Roman Dmowski, a former deputy in the Russian State Duma and the leader of the Endecja movement was especially active in seeking support from the Allies. Dmowski argued that an independent Poland needed access to the sea on demographic, historical and economic grounds as he maintained that a Poland without access to the sea could never be truly independent. After the war Poland was to be re-established as an independent state. Since a Polish state had not existed since the Congress of Vienna, the future republic's territory had to be defined.

Giving Poland access to the sea was one of the guarantees proposed by United States President Woodrow Wilson in his Fourteen Points of January 1918. The thirteenth of Wilson's points was:

An independent Polish state should be erected which should include the territories inhabited by indisputably Polish populations, which should be assured a free and secure access to the sea, and whose political and economic independence and territorial integrity should be guaranteed by international covenant.

The following arguments were behind the creation of the corridor:

==== Ethnographic reasons ====
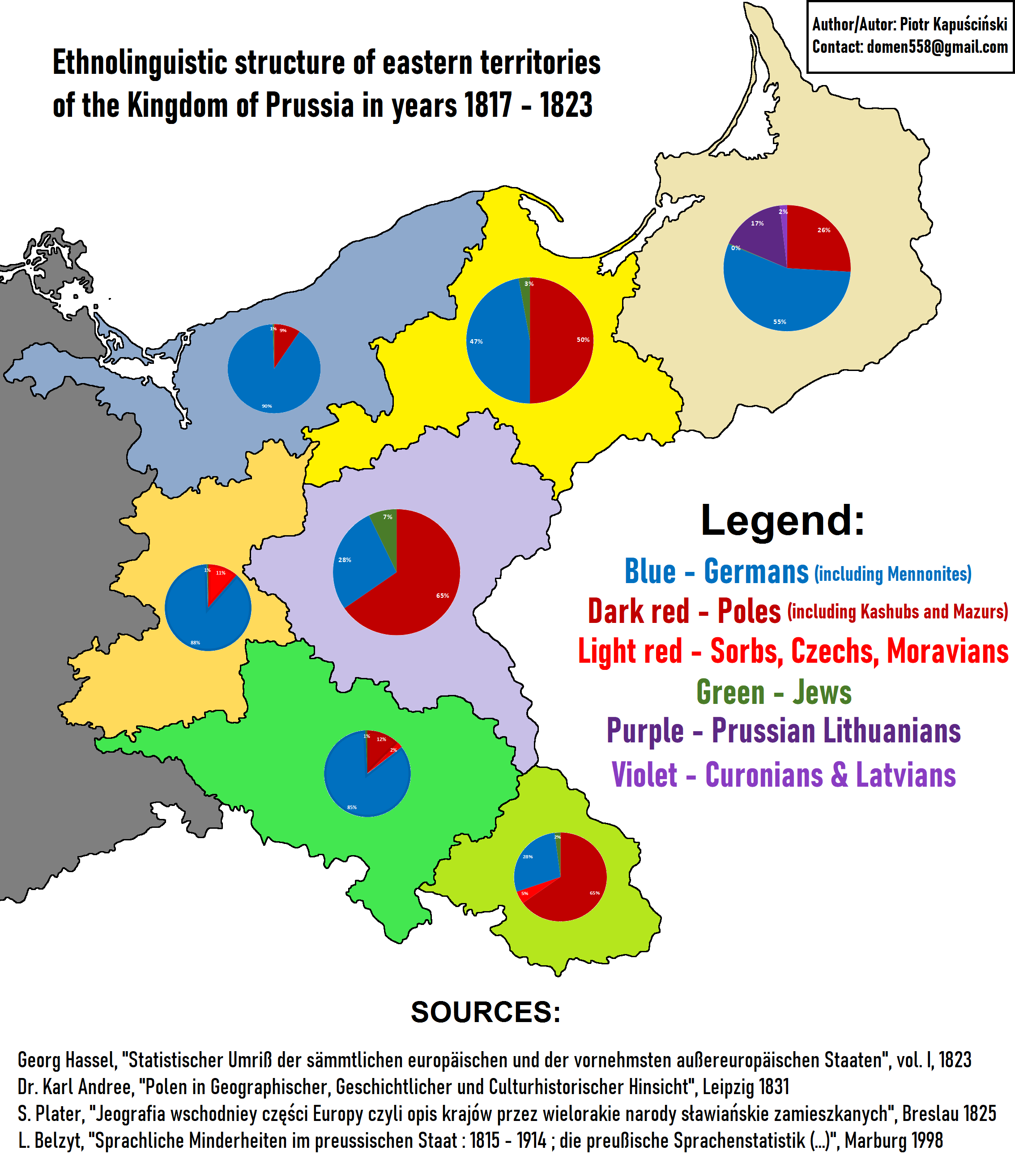
Ethnic structure of the eastern regions of Prussia in 1817–1823

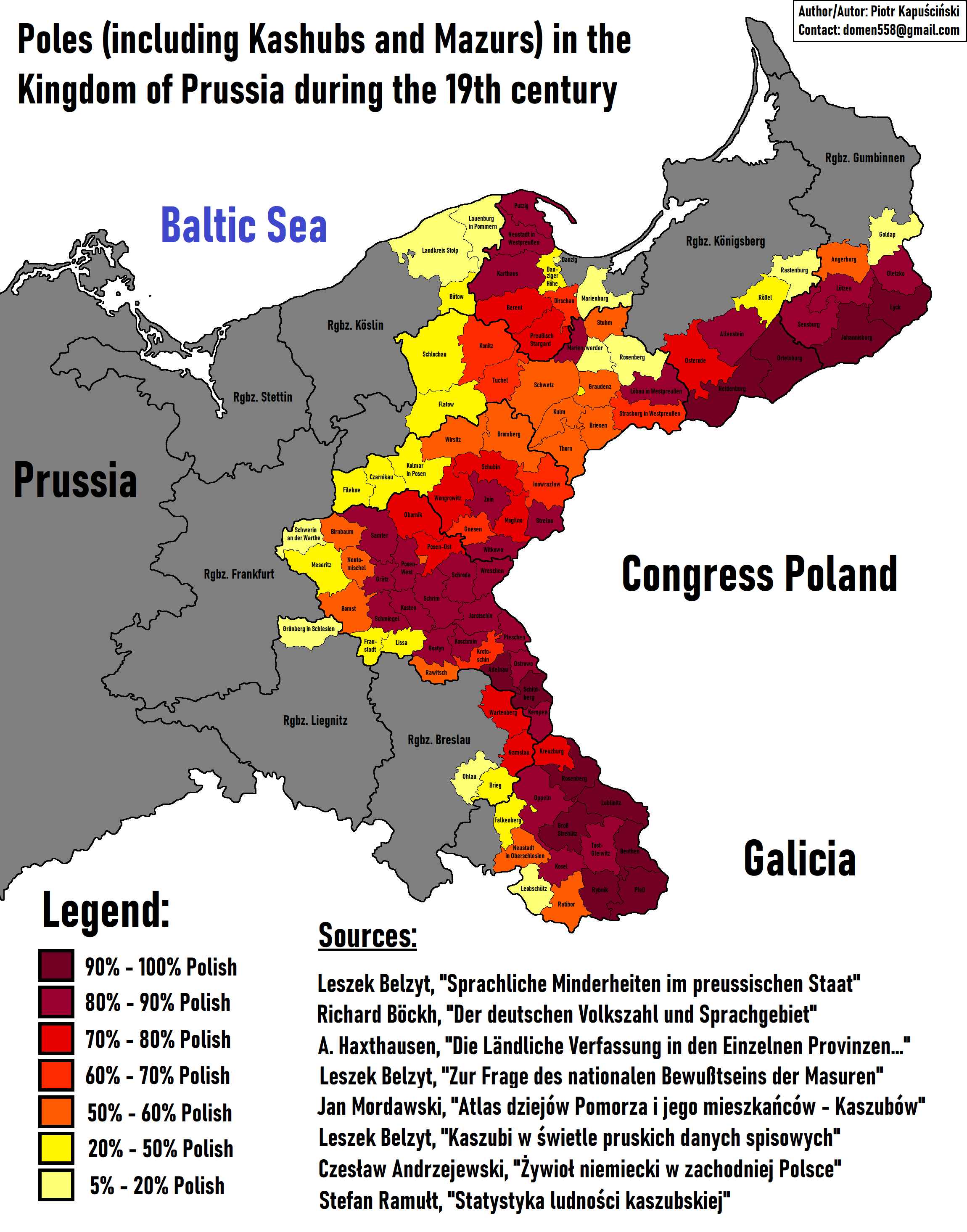
Poles in the Kingdom of Prussia during the 19th century: 90% - 100% Polish 80% - 90% Polish 70% - 80% Polish 60% - 70% Polish 50% - 60% Polish 20% - 50% Polish 5% - 20% Polish

The ethnic situation was one of the reasons for returning the area to the restored Poland. The majority of the population in the area was Polish. As the Polish commission report to the Allied Supreme Council noted on 12 March 1919: "Finally the fact must be recognized that 600,000 Poles in West Prussia would under any alternative plan remain under German rule". Also, as David Hunter Miller from president Woodrow Wilson's group of experts and academics (known as The Inquiry) noted in his diary from the Paris Peace Conference: "If Poland does not thus secure access to the sea, 600,000 Poles in West Prussia will remain under German rule and 20,000,000 Poles in Poland proper will probably have but a hampered and precarious commercial outlet". The Prussian census of 1910 showed that there were 528,000 Poles (including West Slavic Kashubians, who had supported the Polish national lists in German elections) in the region, compared with 385,000 Germans (including troops and officials stationed in the area). The province of West Prussia as a whole had between 36% and 43% ethnic Poles in 1910, depending on the source (the lower number is based directly on German 1910 census figures, while the higher number is based on calculations according to which a large part of those people counted as Catholic Germans in the official census in fact identified as Poles). The Poles did not want the Polish population to remain under the control of the German state, which had in the past treated the Polish population and other minorities as second-class citizens and had pursued Germanization. As Professor Lewis Bernstein Namier (1888–1960) – born to Jewish parents in Lublin Governorate (Russian Empire, former Congress Poland) and later a British citizen, a former member of the British Intelligence Bureau throughout World War I and the British delegation at the Versailles conference, known for his anti-Polish and anti-German attitude – wrote in the Manchester Guardian on November 7, 1933: "The Poles are the Nation of the Vistula, and their settlements extend from the sources of the river to its estuary. ... It is only fair that the claim of the river-basin should prevail against that of the seaboard."

==== Economic reasons ====
The Poles held the view that without direct access to the Baltic Sea, Poland's economic independence would be illusory. Around 60.5% of Polish import trade and 55.1% of exports went through the area. The report of the Polish Commission presented to the Allied Supreme Council said:

1,600,000 Germans in East Prussia can be adequately protected by securing for them freedom of trade across the corridor, whereas it would be impossible to give an adequate outlet to the inhabitants of the new Polish state (numbering 25,000,000) if this outlet had to be guaranteed across the territory of an alien and probably hostile Power.

The United Kingdom eventually accepted this argument. The suppression of the Polish Corridor would have abolished the economic ability of Poland to resist dependence on Germany. As Lewis Bernstein Namier, Professor of Modern History at the University of Manchester and known for both his "legendary hatred of Germany" and Germanophobia as well as his anti-Polish attitude directed against what he defined as the "aggressive, antisemitic and warmongerily imperialist" part of Poland, wrote in a newspaper article in 1933:

The whole of Poland's transport system ran towards the mouth of the Vistula. ... 90% of Polish exports came from her western provinces. ... Cutting through of the Corridor has meant a minor amputation for Germany; its closing up would mean strangulation for Poland."

By 1938, 77.7% of Polish exports left either through Gdańsk (31.6%) or the newly built port of Gdynia (46.1%)

==== The Inquiry's opinion ====
David Hunter Miller, in his diary from the Paris Peace Conference, noted that the problem of Polish access to the sea was very difficult because leaving the entirety of Pomerelia under German control meant cutting off millions of Poles from their commercial outlet and leaving several hundred thousand Poles under German rule, while granting such access meant cutting off East Prussia from the rest of Germany. The Inquiry recommended that both the Corridor and Danzig should have been ceded directly to Poland.

It is believed that the lesser of these evils is preferable, and that the Corridor and Danzig should [both] be ceded to Poland, as shown on map 6. East Prussia, though territorially cut off from the rest of Germany, could easily be assured railroad transit across the Polish corridor (a simple matter as compared with assuring port facilities to Poland), and has, in addition, excellent communication via Königsberg and the Baltic Sea. In either case a people is asked to entrust large interests to the League of Nations. In the case of Poland they are vital interests; in the case of Germany, aside from Prussian sentiment, they are quite secondary".

In the end, The Inquiry's recommendations were only partially implemented: most of West Prussia was given to Poland, but Danzig became a Free City.

== Incorporation into the Second Polish Republic ==
During World War I, the Central Powers had forced the Imperial Russian troops out of Congress Poland and Galicia, as manifested in the Treaty of Brest-Litovsk on 3 March 1918. Following the military defeat of Austria-Hungary, an independent Polish republic was declared in western Galicia on 3 November 1918, the same day Austria signed the armistice. The collapse of Imperial Germany's Western Front, and the subsequent withdrawal of her remaining occupation forces after the Armistice of Compiègne on 11 November allowed the republic led by Roman Dmowski and Józef Piłsudski to seize control over the former Congress Polish areas. Also in November, the revolution in Germany forced Kaiser Wilhelm II's abdication and gave way to the establishment of the Weimar Republic. Starting in December, the Polish-Ukrainian War expanded the Polish republic's territory to include Volhynia and parts of eastern Galicia, while at the same time the German Province of Posen (where even according to the German made 1910 census 61.5% of the population was Polish) was severed by the Greater Poland uprising, which succeeded in attaching most of the province's territory to Poland by January 1919. This led Weimar's Otto Landsberg and Rudolf Breitscheid to call for an armed force to secure Germany's remaining eastern territories (some of which contained significant Polish minorities, primarily on the former Prussian partition territories). The call was answered by the minister of defence Gustav Noske, who decreed support for raising and deploying volunteer Grenzschutz forces to secure East Prussia, Silesia and the Netze District.

On 18 January, the Paris peace conference opened, resulting in the draft of the Treaty of Versailles 28 June 1919. Articles 27 and 28 of the treaty ruled on the territorial shape of the corridor, while articles 89 to 93 ruled on transit, citizenship and property issues. Per the terms of the Versailles treaty, which was put into effect on 20 January 1920, the corridor was established as Poland's access to the Baltic Sea from 70% of the dissolved province of West Prussia, consisting of a small part of Pomerania with around 140 km of coastline including the Hel Peninsula, and 69 km without it.

The primarily German-speaking seaport of Danzig (Gdańsk), controlling the estuary of the main Polish waterway, the Vistula river, became the Free City of Danzig and was placed under the protection of the League of Nations without a plebiscite. After the dock workers of Danzig harbour went on strike during the Polish–Soviet War, refusing to unload ammunition, the Polish Government decided to build an ammunition depot at Westerplatte, and a seaport at Gdynia in the territory of the Corridor, connected to the Upper Silesian industrial centers by the newly constructed Polish Coal Trunk Line railways.

== Exodus of the German population ==
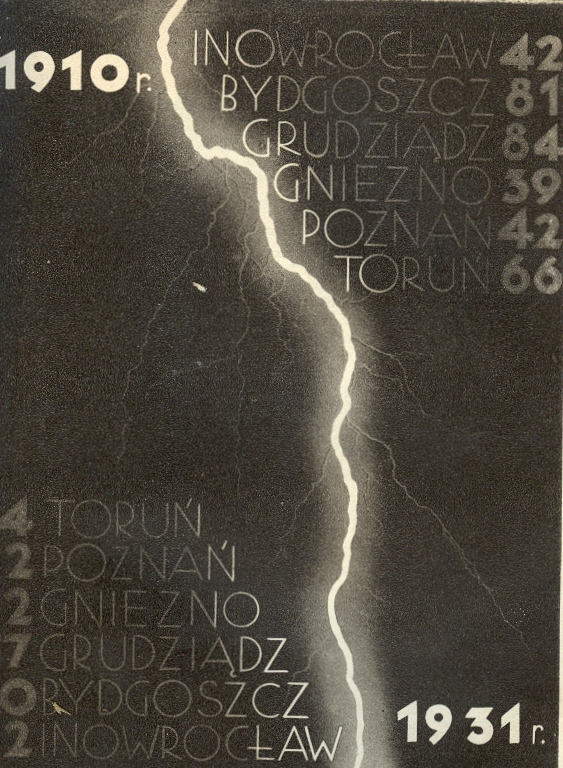
A Polish-language poster, illustrating the drop in German population in selected cities of western Poland in the period 1910–1931

The German author Christian Raitz von Frentz writes that after First World War ended, the Polish government tried to reverse the systematic Germanization from former decades. Frederick the Great (King in/of Prussia from 1740 to 1786) settled around 300,000 colonists in the eastern provinces of Prussia and aimed at a removal of the Polish nobility, which he treated with contempt. Frederick also described Poles as "slovenly Polish trash" and compared them to the Iroquois. On the other hand, he encouraged administrators and teachers who could speak both German and Polish. Prussia pursued a second colonization aimed at Germanization after 1832. The Prussians passed laws aiming at Germanization of the provinces of Posen and West Prussia in the late 19th century. The Prussian Settlement Commission established a further 154,000 colonists, including locals, in the provinces of Posen and West Prussia before World War I. Military personnel were included in the population census. A number of German civil servants and merchants were introduced to the area, which influenced the population status.

According to Richard Blanke, 421,029 Germans lived in the area in 1910, making up 42.5% of the population. Blanke has been criticized by Christian Raitz von Frentz, who has classified his book as part of a series on the subject that has an anti-Polish bias; additionally Polish professor A. Cienciala has described Blanke's views as sympathetic to Germany. In addition to the military personnel included in the population census, a number of German civil servants and merchants were introduced into the area, which influenced the population mix, according to Andrzej Chwalba. By 1921 the proportion of Germans had dropped to 18.8% (175,771). Over the next decade, the German population decreased by another 70,000 to a share of 9.6%.

German political scientist Stefan Wolff, Professor at the University of Birmingham, claims that the actions of Polish state officials after the corridor's establishment followed "a course of assimilation and oppression". As a result, a large number of Germans left Poland after 1918: according to Wolff, 800,000 Germans had left Poland by 1923; according to Gotthold Rhode, 575,000 left the former province of Posen and the corridor after the war; according to Hermann Rauschning, 800,000 Germans had left between 1918 and 1926; contemporary author Alfons Krysinski estimated 800,000 plus 100,000 from East Upper Silesia; the contemporary German statistics say 592,000 Germans had left by 1921; other Polish scholars say that up to a million Germans left. Polish author Władysław Kulski says that a number of them were civil servants with no roots in the province and around 378,000, and this is to a lesser degree is confirmed by some German sources such as Hermann Rauschning. Lewis Bernstein Namier raised the question of whether many of the Germans who left were actually settlers without roots in the area - Namier remarked in 1933, "a question must be raised how many of those Germans had originally been planted artificially in that country by the Prussian Government."

The above-mentioned Richard Blanke, in his book Orphans of Versailles, gives several reasons for the exodus of the German population:

- A number of former settlers from the Prussian Settlement Commission who settled in the area after 1886 in order to Germanize it were in some cases given a month to leave; in other cases they were told to leave at once.
- Poland found itself under threat during the Polish-Bolshevik war of 1919–1921, and the German population feared that Bolshevik forces would control Poland. Migration to Germany was a way to avoid conscription and participation in the war.
- State-employed Germans such as judges, prosecutors, teachers and officials left as Poland did not renew their employment contracts. German industrial workers also left due to fear of lower-wage competition. Many Germans had become economically dependent on Prussian state aid as Prussia had fought against the "Polish problem" in its provinces.
- Germans refused to accept living in a Polish state. As Lewis Bernstein Namier said: "Some Germans undoubtedly left because they would not live under the dominion of a race which they had previously oppressed and despised."
- Germans feared that the Poles would seek reprisals after over a century of harassment and discrimination by the Prussian and German state against the Polish population.
- Social and linguistic isolation: While the population was mixed, only Poles were required to be bilingual. The Germans usually did not learn Polish. When Polish became the only official language in Polish-majority provinces, their situation became difficult. The Poles shunned Germans, which contributed to their isolation.
- Lower standards of living. Poland was a much poorer country than Germany.
- Former Nazi politician and later opponent Hermann Rauschning wrote that 10% of Germans were unwilling to remain in Poland regardless of their treatment, and another 10% were workers from other parts of the German Empire with no roots in the region.

Blanke says that official encouragement by the Polish state played a secondary role in the German exodus. Christian Raitz von Frentz notes "that many of the repressive measures were taken by local and regional Polish authorities in defiance of Acts of Parliament and government decrees, which more often than not conformed with the minorities treaty, the Geneva Convention and their interpretation by the League council – though it is also true that some of the central authorities tacitly tolerated local initiatives against the German population." While there were demonstrations and protests and occasional violence against Germans, they were at a local level, and officials were quick to point out that they were a backlash against former discrimination against Poles. There were other demonstrations when Germans showed disloyalty during the Polish–Soviet War as the Red Army announced the return to the pre-war borders of 1914. Despite popular pressure and occasional local actions, perhaps as many as 80% of Germans emigrated more or less voluntarily.

Helmut Lippelt writes that Germany used the existence of the German minority in Poland for political ends and as part of its revisionist demands, which resulted in Polish countermeasures. Polish Prime Minister Władysław Sikorski stated in 1923 that the de-Germanization of these territories had to be ended by vigorous and quick liquidation of property and eviction of German "Optanten" (Germans who refused to accept Polish citizenship and per the Versailles Treaty were to leave Poland) so that German nationalists would realize that their view of the temporary nature of Poland's western border was wrong. To Lippelt this was partially a reaction to the German claims and partially Polish nationalism, urging to exclude the German element. In turn, anti-Polish prejudice fueled German policy.

== Impact on the East Prussian plebiscite ==
In the period leading up to the East Prussian plebiscite in July 1920, the Polish authorities tried to prevent traffic through the Corridor, interrupting postal, telegraphic and telephone communication. On March 10, 1920, the British representative on the Marienwerder Plebiscite Commission, H. D. Beaumont, wrote of numerous continuing difficulties being made by Polish officials and added "as a result, the ill-will between Polish and German nationalities and the irritation due to Polish intolerance towards the German inhabitants in the Corridor (now under their rule), far worse than any former German intolerance of the Poles, are growing to such an extent that it is impossible to believe the present settlement (borders) can have any chance of being permanent. ... It can confidently be asserted that not even the most attractive economic advantages would induce any German to vote Polish. If the frontier is unsatisfactory now, it will be far more so when it has to be drawn on this side (of the river) with no natural line to follow, cutting off Germany from the river bank and within a mile or so of Marienwerder, which is certain to vote German. I know of no similar frontier created by any treaty."

== Impact on German through-traffic ==
The German Ministry for Transport established the Seedienst Ostpreußen ('Sea Service East Prussia') in 1922 to provide a ferry connection to East Prussia, now a German exclave, so that it would be less dependent on transit through Polish territory.

Connections by train were also possible by sealing the carriages (Korridorzug), i.e. passengers were not forced to apply for an official Polish visa in their passport; however, the rigorous inspections by the Polish authorities before and after the sealing were strongly feared by the passengers.

In May 1925, a train passing through the corridor on its way to East Prussia crashed, because the spikes had been removed from the tracks for a short distance and the fishplates unbolted. 25 people, including 2 children, were killed, while some 30 others were injured.

== Land reform of 1925 ==
According to Polish historian Andrzej Chwalba, during the rule of the Kingdom of Prussia and the German Empire various means were used to increase the amount of land owned by Germans at the expense of the Polish population. In Prussia, the Polish nobility had its estates confiscated after the Partitions, and handed over to German nobility. The same applied to Catholic monasteries. Later, the German Empire bought up land in an attempt to prevent the restoration of a Polish majority in Polish inhabited areas in its eastern provinces. Christian Raitz von Frentz notes that measures aimed at reversing past Germanization included the liquidation of farms settled by the German government during the war under the 1908 law.

In 1925 the Polish government enacted a land reform program with the aim of expropriating landowners. While only 39% of the agricultural land in the Corridor was owned by Germans, the first annual list of properties to be reformed included 10,800 hectares from 32 German landowners and 950 hectares from seven Poles. The voivode of Pomorze, Wiktor Lamot, stressed that "the part of Pomorze through which the so-called corridor runs must be cleansed of larger German holdings". The coastal region "must be settled with a nationally conscious Polish population. ... Estates belonging to Germans must be taxed more heavily to encourage them voluntarily to turn over land for settlement. Border counties ... particularly a strip of land ten kilometers wide, must be settled with Poles. German estates that lie here must be reduced without concern for their economic value or the views of their owners".

Prominent politicians and members of the German minority were the first to be included on the land reform list and to have their property expropriated.

== Weimar German interests ==
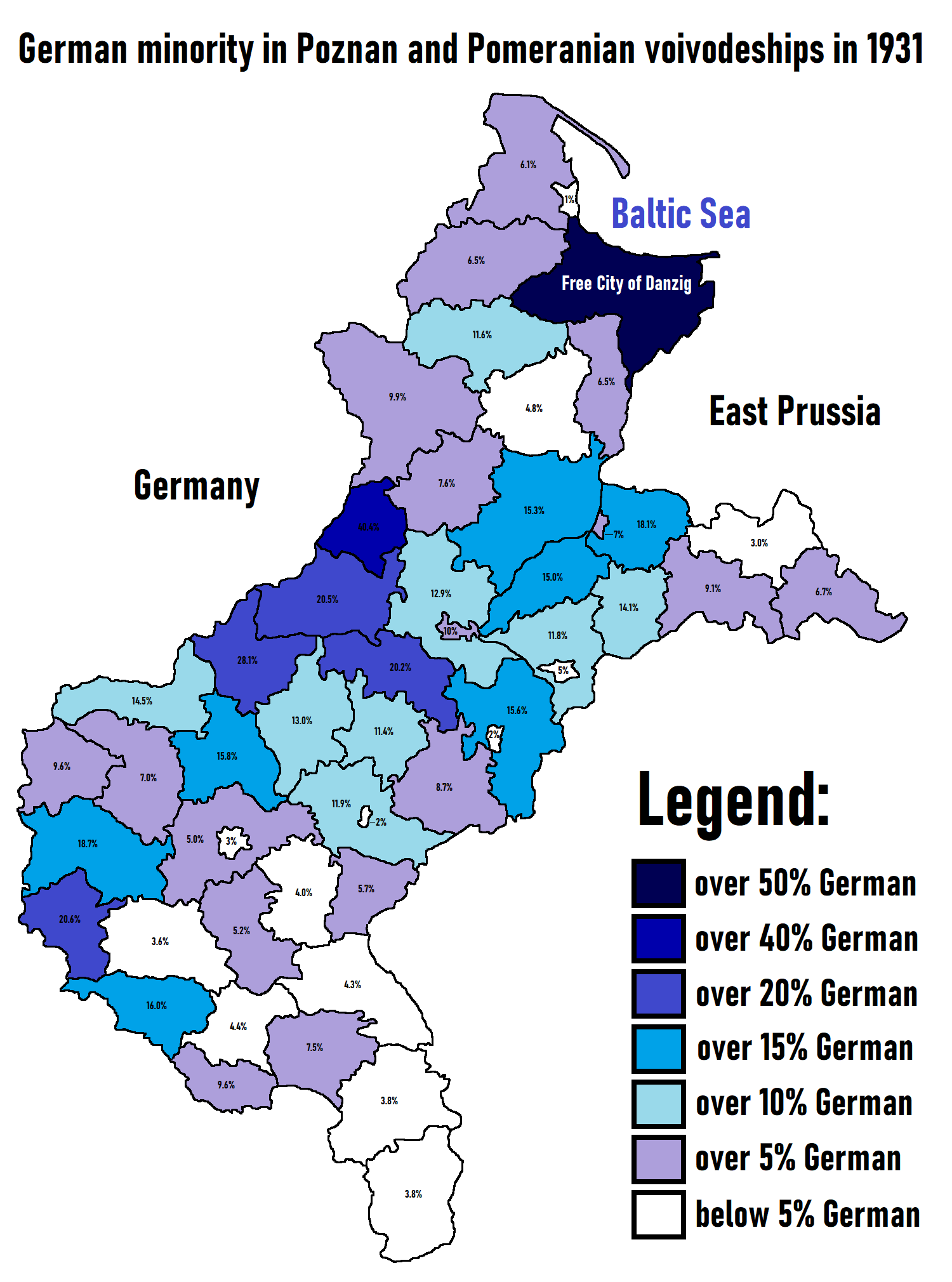
Germans in the Polish Corridor according to the 1931 census

The creation of the corridor aroused great resentment in Germany, and all interwar governments of the Weimar Republic refused to recognize the eastern borders agreed at Versailles, and refused to follow Germany's acknowledgment of its western borders in the Locarno Treaties of 1925 with a similar declaration with respect to its eastern borders.

Institutions in Weimar Germany supported and encouraged German minority organizations in Poland, in part radicalized by the Polish policy towards them, in filing close to 10,000 complaints about violations of minority rights to the League of Nations.

Poland in 1931 declared her commitment to peace, but pointed out that any attempt to revise its borders would mean war. Additionally, in conversation with U.S. President Herbert Hoover, Polish delegate Filipowicz noted that any continued provocations by Germany could tempt the Polish side to invade, in order to settle the issue once and for all.

== Nazi German and Polish diplomacy ==
The Nazi Party, led by Adolf Hitler, took power in Germany in 1933. Hitler at first ostentatiously pursued a policy of rapprochement with Poland, culminating in the ten-year Polish-German Non-Aggression Pact of 1934. In the years that followed, Germany placed an emphasis on rearmament, as did Poland and other European powers. Despite this, the Nazis were able to achieve their immediate goals without provoking armed conflict: firstly, in March 1938 Nazi Germany annexed Austria, and in the late September the Sudetenland after the Munich Agreement; Poland also made an advance against Czechoslovakia and annexed Trans-Olza (1 October 1938). Germany tried to get Poland to join the Anti-Comintern Pact. Poland refused, as the alliance was rapidly becoming a sphere of influence of an increasingly powerful Germany. On 24 October 1938, the German Foreign Minister Joachim von Ribbentrop asked the Polish ambassador Józef Lipski to have Poland sign the Anti-Comintern Pact. During a visit to Rome on 27–28 October 1938, Ribbentrop told the Italian Foreign Minister Count Galeazzo Ciano that he wanted to turn the Anti-Comintern Pact into a military alliance, and spoke of his desire to have Poland, Yugoslavia, Hungary and Romania sign the Anti-Comintern Pact so "all our energies can be directed against the Western democracies". In a secret speech before a group of 200 German journalists on 10 November 1938, Hitler complained that his peace propaganda stressing that his foreign policy was based upon the peaceful revision of the Treaty of Versailles had been too successful with the German people, and he called for a new propaganda campaign intended to stoke a bellicose mood in Germany. Notably, the enemies Hitler had in mind in his speech was not Poland, but rather France and Britain.

Following negotiations with Hitler on the Munich Agreement, British Prime Minister Neville Chamberlain reported that, "He told me privately, and last night he repeated publicly, that after this Sudeten German question is settled, that is the end of Germany's territorial claims in Europe". Almost immediately following the agreement, however, Hitler reneged on it. The Nazis increased their requests for the incorporation of the Free City of Danzig into Germany, citing the "protection" of the German majority as a motive. In November 1938, Danzig's district administrator, Albert Forster, reported to the League of Nations that Hitler had told him Polish frontiers would be guaranteed if the Poles were "reasonable like the Czechs." German State Secretary Ernst von Weizsäcker reaffirmed this alleged guarantee in December 1938. In the winter of 1938–1939, Germany placed increasing pressure on Poland and Hungary to sign the Anti-Comintern Pact.

Initially, the main concern of German diplomacy was not Danzig or the Polish Corridor, but rather having Poland sign the Anti-Comintern Pact, which as the American historian Gerhard Weinberg noted was "... a formal gesture of political and diplomatic obeisance to Berlin, separating them from any other past or prospective international ties, and having nothing to do with the Soviet Union at all". In late 1938–early 1939, Hitler had decided upon war with Britain and France, and having Poland sign the Anti-Comintern Pact was intended to protect Germany's eastern border while the Wehrmacht turned west. In November 1938, Hitler ordered his Foreign Minister Ribbentrop to convert the Anti-Comintern Pact, which had been signed with the Empire of Japan in 1936 and joined by Fascist Italy in 1937 into an anti-British military alliance. Starting in October 1938, the main focus on German military planning was for a war against Britain with Hitler ordering the Luftwaffe to start building a strategical bombing force capable of bombing British cities. On 17 January 1939, Hitler approved of the famous Z Plan that called for a gigantic fleet to take on the Royal Navy and on 27 January 1939 he ordered that henceforward the Kriegsmarine was to have first priority for defence spending.

The situation regarding the Free City and the Polish Corridor created a number of headaches for German and Polish customs. The Germans requested the construction of an extra-territorial Reichsautobahn freeway (to complete the Reichsautobahn Berlin-Königsberg) and railway through the Polish Corridor, effectively annexing Polish territory and connecting East Prussia to Danzig and Germany proper, while cutting off Poland from the sea and its main trade route. If Poland agreed, in return they would extend the non-aggression pact for 25 years.

This seemed to conflict with Hitler's plans to turn Poland into a satellite state and with Poland's rejection of the Anti-Comintern Pact, and his desire either to isolate or to gain support against the Soviet Union. German newspapers in Danzig and Nazi Germany played an important role in inciting nationalist sentiment: headlines buzzed about how Poland was misusing its economic rights in Danzig and German Danzigers were increasingly subjugated to the will of the Polish state. At the same time, Hitler also offered Poland additional territory as an enticement, such as the possible annexation of Lithuania, the Memel Territory, Soviet Ukraine and parts of the Czech lands. However, Polish leaders continued to fear for the loss of their independence and a fate like that of Czechoslovakia, which had yielded the Sudetenland to Germany in October 1938, only to be invaded by Germany in March 1939. Some felt that the Danzig question was inextricably tied to the problems in the Polish Corridor and any settlement regarding Danzig would be one step towards the eventual loss of Poland's access to the sea. Hitler's credibility outside Germany was very low after the occupation of Czechoslovakia, though some British and French politicians approved of a peaceful revision of the corridor's borders.

In 1939, Nazi Germany made another attempt to renegotiate the status of Danzig; Poland was to retain a permanent right to use the seaport if the route through the Polish Corridor was to be constructed. However, the Polish administration distrusted Hitler and saw the plan as a threat to Polish sovereignty, practically subordinating Poland to the Axis and the Anti-Comintern Bloc while reducing the country to a state of near-servitude as its entire trade would be dependent on Germany. Robert Coulondre, the French ambassador in Berlin in a dispatch to the Foreign Minister Georges Bonnet wrote on 30 April 1939 that Hitler sought: "...a mortgage on Polish foreign policy, while itself retaining complete liberty of action allowing the conclusion of political agreements with other countries. In these circumstances, the new settlement proposed by Germany, which would link the questions of Danzig and of the passage across the Corridor with counterbalancing questions of a political nature, would only serve to aggravate this mortgage and practically subordinate Poland to the Axis and the Anti-Comintern Bloc. Warsaw refused this in order to retain its independence."

Hitler used the issue of the status city as pretext for attacking Poland, while explaining during a high-level meeting of German military officials in May 1939 that his real goal is obtaining Lebensraum for Germany, isolating Poles from their Allies in the West and afterwards attacking Poland, thus avoiding the repeat of the Czech situation, where the Western powers became involved.

== Ultimatum of 1939 ==
A revised and less favorable proposal came in the form of an ultimatum delivered by the Nazis in late August, after the orders had already been given to attack Poland on September 1, 1939. Nevertheless, at midnight on August 29, von Ribbentrop handed British Ambassador Sir Nevile Henderson a list of terms that would allegedly ensure peace in regard to Poland. Danzig was to return to Germany and there was to be a plebiscite in the Polish Corridor; Poles who had been born or had settled there since 1919 would have no vote, while all Germans born but not living there would. An exchange of minority populations between the two countries was proposed. If Poland accepted these terms, Germany would agree to the British offer of an international guarantee, which would include the Soviet Union. A Polish plenipotentiary, with full powers, was to arrive in Berlin and accept these terms by noon the next day. The British Cabinet viewed the terms as "reasonable," except the demand for a Polish plenipotentiary, which was seen as similar to Czechoslovak President Emil Hácha accepting Hitler's terms in mid-March 1939.

It was not until the following noon that the Polish Ambassador Józef Lipski appeared at the Foreign Office and sought an audience with Ribbentrop. Five hours later he was shown in, and since he did not have the negotiating authority demanded by Hitler, Ribbentrop briefly dismissed him with the information that he would inform the "Führer" of this. Thus the German-Polish relations were severed.

== Nazi German invasion – end of the corridor ==
On September 1, 1939, Germany invaded Poland. The German Fourth Army defeated the Polish Pomorze Army, which had been tasked with the defence of this region, and captured the corridor during the Battle of Tuchola Forest by September 5. The corridor was subsequently directly annexed by Germany until it was recaptured by the Red Army at the end of the war. Other notable battles took place at Westerplatte, the Polish post office in Danzig, Oksywie, and Hel.

== Ethnic composition ==
Most of the area was inhabited by Poles, Germans, and Kashubians. The census of 1910 showed that there were 528,000 Poles (including West Slavic Kashubians) compared to 385,000 Germans in the region. The census included German soldiers stationed in the area as well as public officials sent to administer the area. Since 1886, a Settlement Commission was set up by Prussia to enforce German settlement while at the same time Poles, Jews and Germans migrated west during the Ostflucht. In 1921 the proportion of Germans in Pomerania (where the Corridor was located) was 18.8% (175,771). Over the next decade, the German population decreased by another 70,000 to a share of 9.6%. There was also a Jewish minority. In 1905, Kashubians numbered about 72,500. After the occupation by Nazi Germany, a census was made by the German authorities in December 1939. 71% of people declared themselves as Poles, 188,000 people declared Kashubian as their language, 100,000 of those declared themselves Polish.

German population in the Polish Corridor as of 1921, per Blanke 1993
County	Total population	German population	German percentage
Działdowo (Soldau)	23,290	8,187	34.5% (35.2%)
Lubawa (Löbau)	59,765	4,478	7.6%
Brodnica (Strasburg)	61,180	9,599	15.7%
Wąbrzeźno (Briesen)	47,100	14,678	31.1%
Toruń (Thorn)	79,247	16,175	20.4%
Chełmno (Kulm)	46,823	12,872	27.5%
Świecie (Schwetz)	83,138	20,178	24.3%
Grudziądz (Graudenz)	77,031	21,401	27.8%
Tczew (Dirschau)	62,905	7,854	12.5%
Wejherowo (Neustadt)	71,692	7,857	11.0%
Kartuzy (Karthaus)	64,631	5,037	7.8%
Kościerzyna (Berent)	49,935	9,290	18.6%
Starogard Gdański (Preußisch Stargard)	62,400	5,946	9.5%
Chojnice (Konitz)	71,018	13,129	18.5%
Tuchola (Tuchel)	34,445	5,660	16.4%
Sępólno Krajeńskie (Zempelburg)	27,876	13,430	48.2%
Total	935,643 (922,476 when added)	175,771	18.8% (19.1% with 922,476)

== After World War II ==
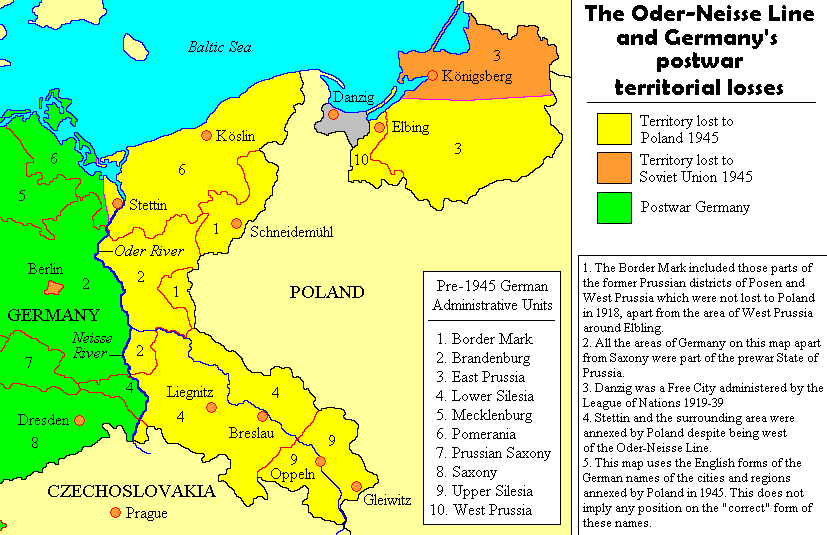
The Oder–Neisse line

At the 1945 Potsdam Conference following the German defeat in World War II, Poland's borders were reorganized at the insistence of the Soviet Union, which occupied the entire area. Territories east of the Oder-Neisse line, including Danzig, were put under Polish administration. The conference did not debate about the future of the territories that were part of western Poland before the war, including the corridor. It automatically became part of the reborn state in 1945.

Many German residents were executed, others were expelled to the Soviet occupation zone, which later became East Germany.

== The corridor in literature ==
In The Shape of Things to Come, published in 1933, H. G. Wells correctly predicted that the corridor would be the starting point of a future Second World War. He depicted the war as beginning in January 1940 and would involve heavy aerial bombing of civilians, but that it would result in a 10-year trench warfare-esque stalemate between Poland and Germany eventually leading to a worldwide societal collapse in the 1950s.

== See also ==
- Czech Corridor (concept)
- Eilat corridor, Israel
- Jerusalem corridor, Israel
- Antofagasta or Atacama corridor, Bolivia
- Persian Corridor, Iran 1941–1946
- Lachin corridor, Armenia and Azerbaijan
- Siliguri Corridor, India
- Tin Bigha Corridor, Bangladesh
- Wakhan Corridor, Afghanistan, created to separate rather than link areas
- Brčko corridor, Republika Srpska, Bosnia and Herzegovina
- Caprivi Strip, Namibia, connecting the country to the Zambezi River
