= Robert E. Condon =

American Air Force general (1896–1981)

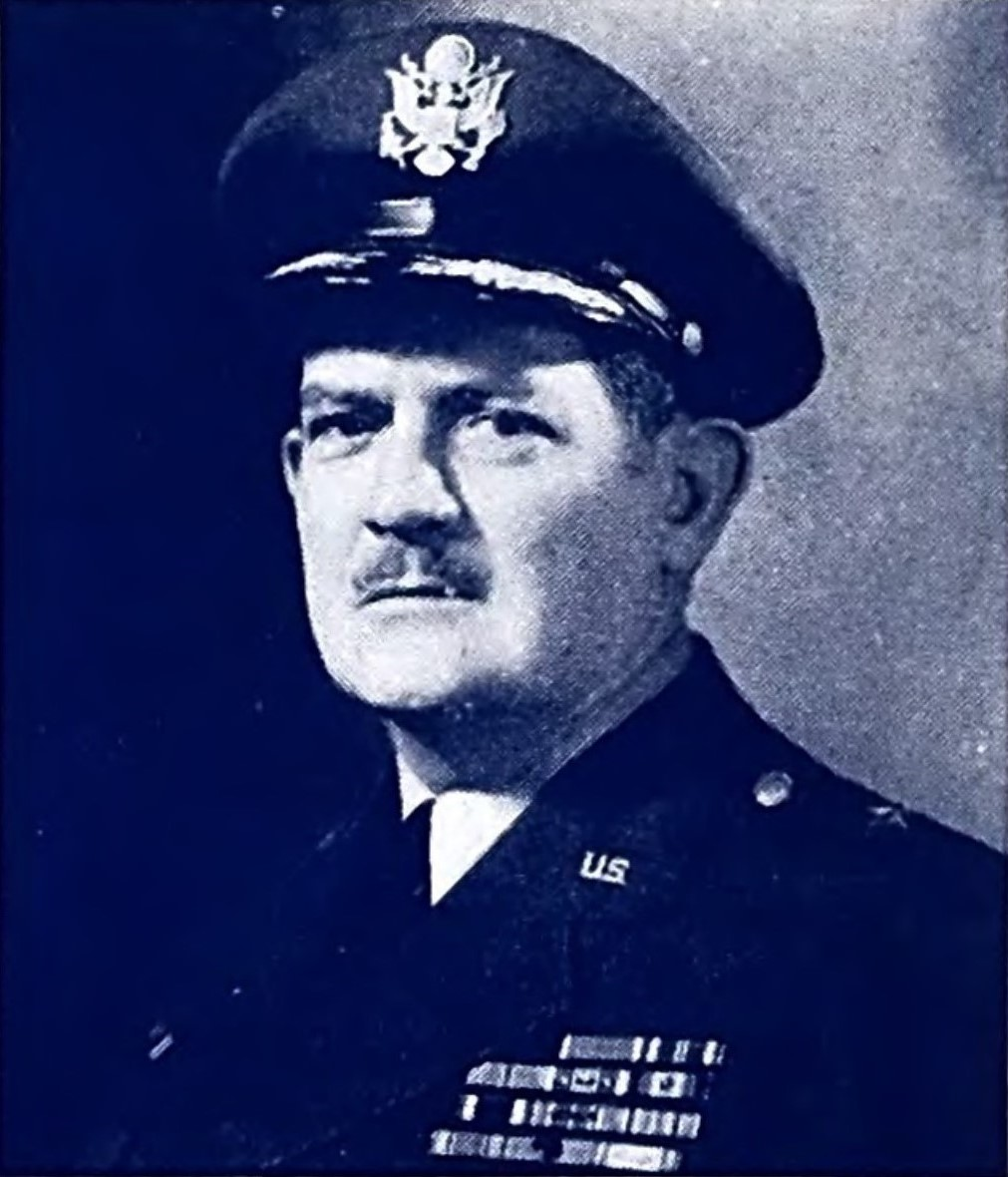
- Brig. Gen. Condon circa 1952
- Born: 17 March 1896; Vernon, Texas
- Died: 26 June 1981 (aged 85); Goshen, New York
- Military career
- Allegiance: United States
- Branch: United States Army; United States Air Force
- Service years: 1917–1956
- Rank: Major General
- Conflicts: World War I; World War II; Korean War
- Awards: Legion of Merit (2); Distinguished Flying Cross; Bronze Star Medal

Robert Emmett Condon (17 March 1896 – 26 June 1981) was an American military officer who served during three major conflicts and rose from private to major general over the course of his long career. In later life, he served as director of civil defense for New York City.

== Early life and education ==
Born in Vernon, Texas, Condon attended high school in Amarillo, Texas. He then studied at the Catholic Academy in Shawnee, Oklahoma. After his family moved to Kansas City, Missouri, Condon attended the Kansas City School of Law and Commerce.

== Career ==
After American entry into World War I, Condon enlisted as a private in the United States Army in 1917 and was assigned to the 35th Division. He was promoted to sergeant and then, in March 1918, was commissioned as a second lieutenant of infantry. After completing training, Condon served with the American Expeditionary Forces in France. In October 1918, he was sent with his platoon to the island of Islay in Scotland to assist in the military burials of over four hundred American soldiers who had perished in the accidental sinking of the HMS Otranto.

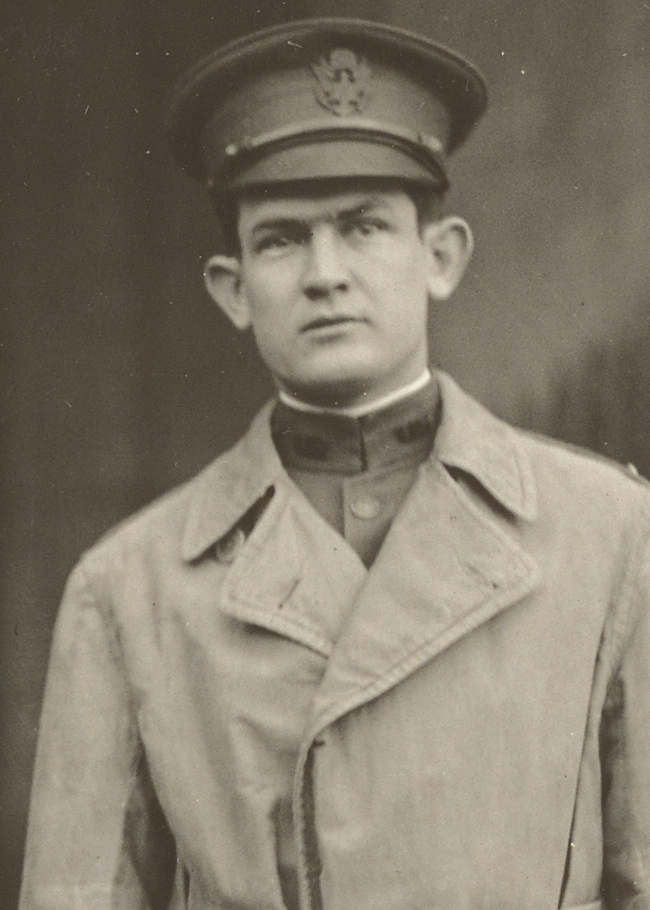
Lt. Condon in December 1918

After the Armistice, Condon was assigned to the American Commission to Negotiate Peace in Paris as an aide and secretary to Ambassador Henry White in December 1918. In early 1919, he was promoted to first lieutenant. In November 1919, Condon was relieved from active duty and commissioned as a captain in the Army Reserves.

Returning to civilian life in the United States, Condon was one of the seventeen co-founders of the United States Junior Chamber of Commerce in 1920. He later served as national president of the organization. Condon also helped establish the American Legion.

By 1929, Condon was living in Manhattan. He served as the first chairman of the New York City Traffic Commission. Before American entry into World War II, Condon worked as an industrial engineer for AT&T.

In May 1939, a New York jury awarded Condon $8,000 in a civil suit against Cincinnati Reds pitcher Paul Derringer. Condon had sued Derringer for $25,000 over an altercation which had occurred during the 1936 Democratic National Convention in Philadelphia, where Condon was hosting a reception in his hotel suite for Secretary of War Harry Woodring and others. The jury found Derringer liable, but reduced the amount to be more commensurate with his annual salary. In July 1939, the incident was settled for an undisclosed amount to allow Derringer to participate in the 1939 Major League Baseball All-Star Game at Yankee Stadium without being arrested.

In April 1942, Condon was promoted to major and recalled to active duty in the Army Air Forces. He listed his hometown as Larchmont, New York. In July 1942, Condon graduated from the Air Intelligence School at Harrisburg, Pennsylvania. He then served as a combat intelligence officer for the 98th Bomb Group based in Palestine. Participating in Mediterranean Theatre operations, Condon earned the Distinguished Flying Cross and a Bronze Star Medal. He was also made an honorary officer of the French Foreign Legion.

Promoted to lieutenant colonel, Condon returned to the United States in March 1943 to serve on the staff of the Air Intelligence School. In September 1943, he was reassigned to the staff of the First Air Force. During the remainder of the war, Condon served in various posts there and was promoted to colonel. He was awarded the Legion of Merit and relieved from active duty in October 1946.

Returning again to civilian life, Condon became president of the National Economic Mobilization Council. As a member of the Air Force Reserve, he received a five-year appointment as a brigadier general in February 1948. With the outbreak of the Korean War, Condon was recalled to active duty on 15 March 1951 and assigned to the Office of Public Information in the Office of the Secretary of Defense. In April 1952, he became deputy commander for Reserve Affairs at the headquarters of Continental Air Command at Mitchel Air Force Base, Long Island, New York.

Condon was reappointed brigadier general in March 1953. He was relieved from active duty in 1954 and received a second award of the Legion of Merit. His promotion to major general in the Air Force Reserve was approved in June 1955.

In 1955, Condon was appointed director of civil defense by New York City Mayor Robert F. Wagner, who had also served as an Army Air Forces intelligence officer during World War II. At the age of sixty, Condon retired from the Air Force Reserve on 31 March 1956. He continued to hold the post of director of civil defense until Mayor John V. Lindsay took office in January 1966.

== Personal ==
Condon was the son of James Francis Condon. He had a sister.

On 23 November 1929, Condon married Gertrude Camille Edwards (27 September 1900 – 29 September 1983) at the Church of St. Augustine in Larchmont, New York. She changed her name to Camille Gertrude Condon after their marriage. They had a daughter and a son.

After his retirement, Condon and his wife lived in Goshen, New York. On 26 June 1981, Condon died at Arden Hill Hospital there. On 7 December 1998, Condon and his wife were interred in Section 65 of Arlington National Cemetery.
