= The Inquiry =

1917 study group to prepare for the Paris Peace Conference

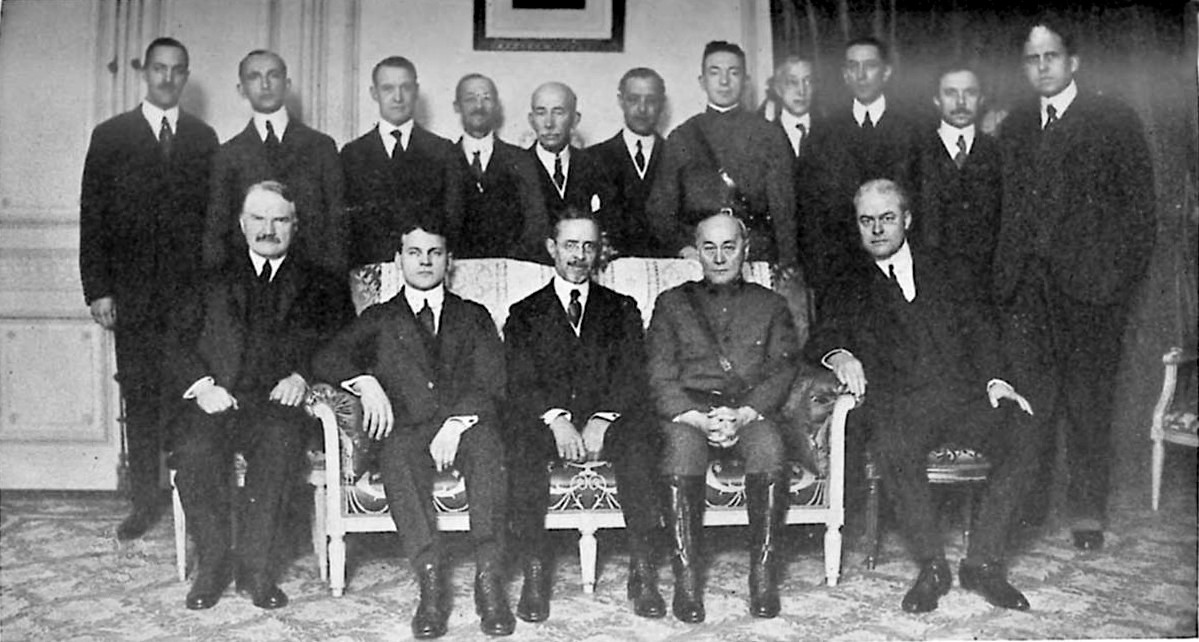
1919 group photo of Inquiry members at the Paris Peace Conference, sitting left to right: Charles Homer Haskins, Western Europe; Isaiah Bowman, Chief of Territorial Intelligence; Sidney Edward Mezes, Director; James Brown Scott, International Law; David Hunter Miller, International Law; standing Charles Seymour, Austria-Hungary; R. H. Lord, Poland; William Linn Westermann, Western Asia; Mark Jefferson, Cartography; Edward M. House; George Louis Beer, Colonies; D.W. Johnson, Geography; Clive Day, Balkans; W. E. Lunt, Italy; James T. Shotwell, History; Allyn Abbott Young, Economics

The Inquiry was a study group established in September 1917 by Woodrow Wilson to prepare materials for the peace negotiations following World War I. The group, composed of around 150 academics, was directed by the presidential adviser Edward House and supervised directly by the philosopher Sidney Mezes. The Heads of Research were Walter Lippmann and his successor Isaiah Bowman. The group first worked out of the New York Public Library but later worked from the offices of the American Geographical Society of New York once Bowman had joined the group.

Mezes's senior colleagues were the geographer Isaiah Bowman, the historian and librarian Archibald Cary Coolidge, the historian James Shotwell, and the lawyer David Hunter Miller. Progressive confidants who were consulted on staffing but did not contribute directly to the administration or reports of the group included James Truslow Adams, Louis Brandeis, Abbott Lawrence Lowell, and Walter Weyl.

Twenty-one members of The Inquiry, later integrated into the larger American Commission to Negotiate Peace, traveled to the Paris Peace Conference in January 1919 and accompanied Wilson aboard USS George Washington to France.

Also included in the group were such academics as Paul Monroe, a professor of history at Columbia University and a key member of the Research Division who drew on his experience in the Philippines to assess the educational needs of developing areas such as Albania, Turkey, and Central Africa, and Frank A. Golder, a history professor from Washington State University, who specialized in the diplomatic history of Russia and wrote papers on Ukraine, Lithuania, Poland, and Russia.

== Recommendations ==
The Inquiry provided various recommendations for the countries which it surveyed. Specifically, the recommendations discussed the ideal borders for various countries as well as various other conditions that were felt necessary to achieve a lasting peace free of tensions.

=== France, Belgium, Luxembourg, and Denmark ===
The Inquiry recommended that Alsace–Lorraine be returned to France, that parts of Saarland that France had controlled before 1815 be returned to that country, and that the Rhineland be demilitarized. It was recommended that Belgium's neutral status be abolished and that Belgium be allowed to annex territory in the Maastricht region for strategic reasons and in the Malmedy region for ethnic reasons. It was recommended that Luxembourg either be annexed to Belgium or be restored to independence. Meanwhile, the Inquiry recommended that there be a plebiscite in northern Schleswig, with the area transferred from Germany to Denmark if the region's people preferred.

=== Russia, Poland, and the former Russian Empire ===
The Inquiry suggested that if it was possible for Russia to become a genuine federal and democratic state, the Baltic states (with the possible exception of Lithuania) and Ukraine should be encouraged to reunify with Russia because of the belief that it would best serve the economic interests of everyone involved. Meanwhile, if the Bolsheviks maintained their control of Russia, the Inquiry suggested that the independence of the Baltic states and Ukraine be recognized, with a referendum on reunion with Russia at some future better time. The borders that the Inquiry proposed for Ukraine, Latvia, and Estonia were very similar to their 1991 borders. Indeed, the Inquiry even suggested that Crimea be given to Ukraine.

The Inquiry expressed support for Finnish independence and also expressed a desire, never realized, that Åland be transferred from Finland to Sweden. It was recommended that an independent Poland be created, encompassing all indisputably Polish areas, that Poland and Lithuania unite if possible, and that Poland "be given secure and unhampered access to the Baltic [Sea]" through a Polish Corridor. While acknowledging that it would be unfortunate to separate East Prussia, with its 1,600,000 Germans, from the rest of Germany, the Inquiry considered that to be better than denying Poland, a nation of 20,000,000 people, access to the sea. In addition, the Inquiry expressed confidence that Germany could easily be assured railroad transit across the Polish Corridor. As for Poland's eastern borders, the Inquiry kept the door open to Polish annexation of eastern Galicia and Belarusian-majority territories to its north.

In the Caucasus, the Inquiry suggested an independent Armenia in the borders contemplated for Wilsonian Armenia, and provisional independence for both Georgia and Azerbaijan. In addition, the idea of a future union of Armenia, Georgia, and Azerbaijan (in the form of a Transcaucasian Federation) was discussed and viewed favorably by the Inquiry.

=== Czechoslovakia, Romania, Yugoslavia, and Italy ===
It was suggested that Czechoslovakia be created out of the Czech-majority and Slovak-majority areas of the former Austria-Hungary. In addition, it was suggested that Czechoslovakia include the Sudetenland, Subcarpathian Ruthenia, and more than 500,000 Hungarians (Magyars) south of Slovakia.

The Inquiry advised that Romania be allowed to annex all of Bessarabia, the Romanian-majority part of Bukovina, all of Transylvania, the Romanian-majority areas in Hungary proper, and about two thirds of the Banat. In addition, the Inquiry suggested having Romania cede Southern Dobruja to Bulgaria, which ultimately occurred in 1940. Meanwhile, it was suggested that an "independent federated Yugo-Slav state" be created out of Serbia, Montenegro, and the Serbian, Croatian, and Slovenian territories of the former Austria-Hungary.

The Inquiry acknowledged that the Brenner Pass, which had been promised to Italy in the 1915 Treaty of London, would give Italy the best strategic frontier, but it recommended a line somewhat further south, to reduce the number of ethnic Germans in Italy while still giving Italy a frontier more defensible than the prewar border. In addition, it was suggested that Italy be allowed to annex Istria, with its many ethnic Italians, but not Italian-majority Fiume, given that city's importance to Yugoslavia. The Inquiry also advised that Italy end its occupation of Rhodes and the Dodecanese Islands and give the islands to Greece, in accordance with the wishes of their inhabitants, something that was not done until 1947, after World War II. The Inquiry recommended that Italian Libya "be given a hinterland adequate for access to the Sudan and its trade."

=== German Austria and Hungary ===
It was recommended that German Austria, later renamed the Republic of Austria, be established as an independent state and be given an outlet for trade at Trieste, Fiume, or both cities. Meanwhile, it was suggested that Hungary be given independence with borders similar to those it ultimately received by the Treaty of Trianon and that it to be given an outlet for trade at either Trieste or Fiume as well as "rights of unrestricted commerce on the lower Danube." The Inquiry advised that the German-majority Burgenland remain part of Hungary to avoid "disturb[ing] long-established institutions," at least until it became clear that the people there indeed desired union with Austria.

=== Albania, Constantinople, the Straits, and the Middle East ===
No specific recommendations were given for Albania, given the extremely complex nature of the situation there.

The Inquiry suggested that Constantinople become an internationalized state and that the Bosporus, the Sea of Marmara, and the Dardanelles be permanently open to ships and commercial vessels of all countries, with international guarantees to uphold that status. Meanwhile, it was advised that an independent Turkish Anatolian state be created, to be superintended by one of the Great Powers under a League of Nations mandate.

Also, the Inquiry suggested that independent Mesopotamian and Syrian states be created under a League of Nations mandate, with the mandates awarded to powers to be named later. The proposed Syrian state would consist of territories that are now part of Lebanon, northern Jordan, and western Syria. Meanwhile, the proposed Mesopotamian state would consist of territories now part of Iraq and northeastern Syria. In addition, it was advised that the option to create an Arab confederation, to include Mesopotamia and Syria, be kept open.

As for Palestine, it was advised that an independent state under a British mandate be created. Jews would be invited to settle in Palestine if the protection of the personal, religious, and property rights of the non-Jewish population were assured, with the state's holy sites under the protection of the League of Nations. The League was to recognize Palestine as a Jewish state as soon as it was in fact.

As for Arabia, it was suggested that the King of Hejaz not be given assistance to impose his rule over unwilling Arab tribes.

== Legacy ==
Some of the members later established the Council on Foreign Relations, which is independent of the government.

The Inquiry's papers are currently stored at the National Archives, though some of their papers (in many cases, duplicates) are stored at the Yale Archives.
