= John Huston Finley =

American journalist and academic (1863–1940)

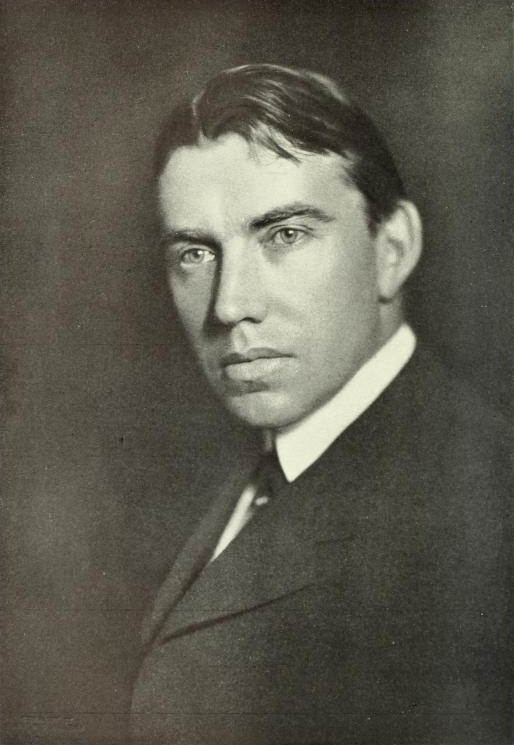

3rd President of City College of New York
- In office 1903–1913
- Preceded by: Alexander Stewart Webb
- Succeeded by: Sidney Edward Mezes

2nd Commissioner of Education of the State of New York
- In office 1913–1921
- Preceded by: Andrew S. Draper
- Succeeded by: Frank Pierrepont Graves

9th President of the American Geographical Society
- In office 1925–1934
- Preceded by: John Greenough
- Succeeded by: Roland L. Redmond

Personal details
- Born: October 19, 1863 Grand Ridge, Illinois, U.S.
- Died: March 7, 1940 (aged 76) New York City, New York, U.S.
- Parent(s): James Gibson Finley; Lydia Margaret McCombs
- Education: Knox College; Johns Hopkins University

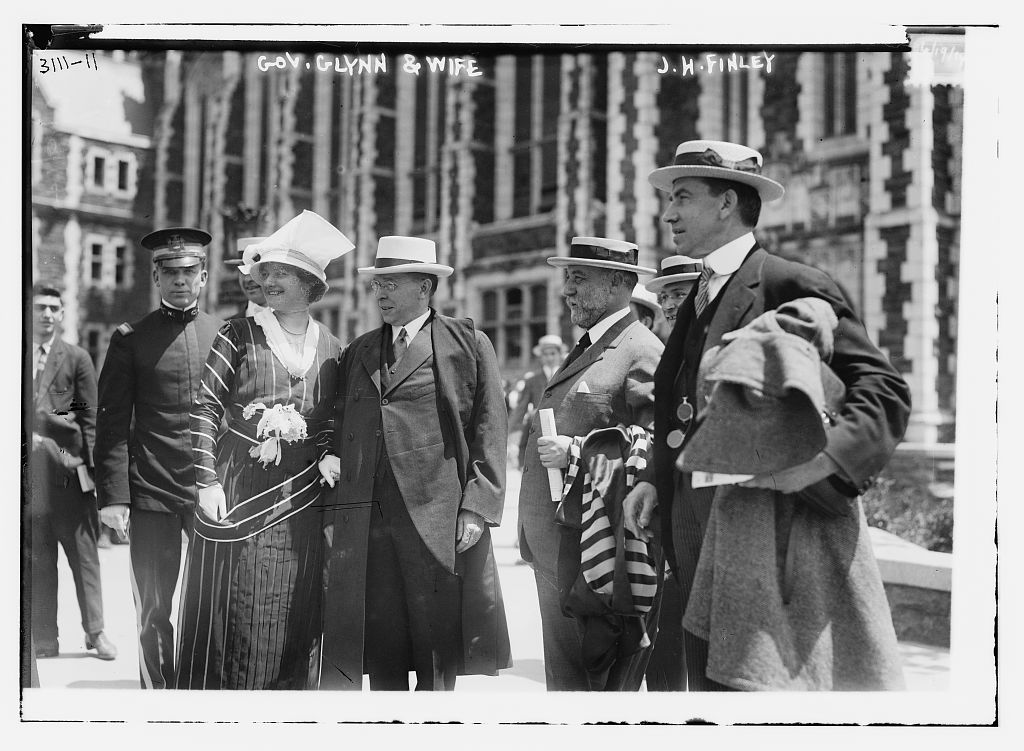
Governor Glynn and his wife, with Finley at City College of New York in 1913

John Huston Finley (October 19, 1863 – March 7, 1940) was Professor of Polities at Princeton University from 1900 to 1903, and President of the City College of New York from 1903 until 1913, when he was appointed President of the University of the State of New York and Commissioner of Education of the State of New York. A promenade along the western bank of the East River between 63rd Street and 125th Street in Manhattan was named the John Finley Walk in 1940 because he had often walked the perimeter of Manhattan.

== Biography ==
He was born on October 19, 1863, in Grand Ridge, Illinois, the oldest son of James Gibson Finley and Lydia Margaret McCombs. His father and mother went out as early settlers on the prairies from the East. His father was the great-grandson of the Reverend James Finley, the first minister, it is believed, to settle permanently beyond the Allegheny Mountains in Western Pennsylvania, and brother of Dr. Samuel Finley, President of the College of New Jersey (now Princeton University) in the middle of the eighteenth century. Mr. Finley's brother, Robert, who died in his early thirties, was associate editor of the Review of Reviews; his sister, Bertha, died as a missionary in Korea.

Finley was educated in the public schools of Grand Ridge, Ottawa Township High School, and Knox College, Galesburg, Illinois, receiving the degree of A.B. and A.M., and afterward took up post-graduate work at the Johns Hopkins University. He was valedictorian of his class at Knox and won the interstate prize in oratory in 1887. He was made an honorary member of the Northwestern chapter of Phi Beta Kappa. He was Secretary of the Illinois State Charities Aid Association, 1889–1892, and President of Knox College, 1892–1899. In the latter year, he went to New York, but after a year in the editorial departments of the publishing houses of Harpers and McClure's, returned to educational work, upon an invitation to take a newly established chair at Princeton University. He was Professor of Polities at Princeton from 1900 to 1903, and President of the College of the City of New York from 1903 until 1913, when he was appointed President of the University of the State of New York and Commissioner of Education of the State of New York. He was also Harvard University exchange lecturer on the Hyde Foundation at the Sorbonne in Paris from 1910 to 1911. During World War I he headed the Red Cross Commission in Palestine.

Finley was appointed The New York Times associate editor in 1921. On April 21, 1937, The Times announced Dr. Finley's appointment as editor-in-chief. He held that position until Nov. 16, 1938, when because of poor health he took the title of editor emeritus. Finley was president of the American Geographical Society from 1925 to 1934. He remained an honorary president there until his death. His position on the Times placed him in contact with the great explorers and fliers of the day, who signed their names for him on a terrestrial globe, which he presented to the Society in 1929. He also served on the board of trustees for Science Service, now known as Society for Science & the Public, from 1925 to 1940.

John H. Finley died of a coronary embolism, while sleeping, the morning of March 7, 1940 in New York City.

== Legacy ==
During his long and distinguished career he received honorary degrees from over thirty colleges and universities, and twelve governments bestowed thirteen decorations on him. He was elected to the American Philosophical Society in 1919.

In 1939 Finley was awarded American Library Association Honorary Membership.

Academic offices
Preceded by Alexander Stewart Webb	President of City College of New York; 1903 – 1913	Succeeded by Sidney Edward Mezes
