= Grand Ridge, Illinois =

Grand Ridge
- Village
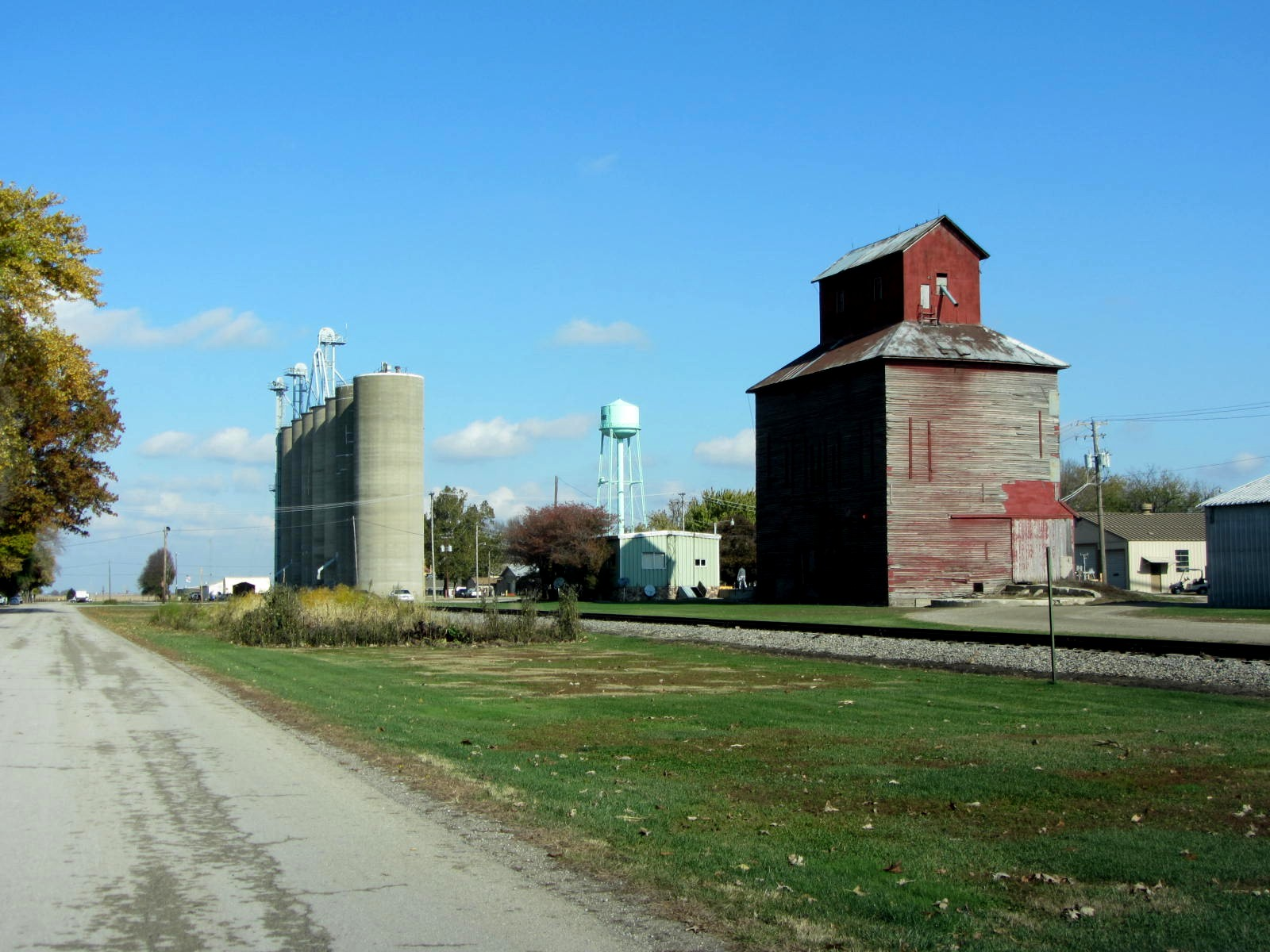
- Grand Ridge in 2011
- Nickname: The Ridge
- Location of Grand Ridge in LaSalle County, Illinois.
- Coordinates: 41°14′10″N 88°49′52″W
- Country: United States
- State: Illinois
- County: LaSalle
- Township: Farm Ridge

Area
  - Total: 0.46 sq mi (1.20 km^{2})
  - Land: 0.46 sq mi (1.20 km^{2})
  - Water: 0 sq mi (0.00 km^{2})
- Elevation: 650 ft (200 m)

Population (2020)
  - Total: 515
  - Density: 1,115.6/sq mi (430.75/km^{2})
- Time zone: UTC-6 (CST)
  - Summer (DST): UTC-5 (CDT)
- ZIP code: 61325
- Area code: 815
- FIPS code: 17-30757
- GNIS feature ID: 2398188
- Website: https://villageofgrandridge.org/

Grand Ridge is a village in LaSalle County, Illinois, United States. The population was 515 at the 2020 census, down from 560 in 2010. It is part of the Ottawa Micropolitan Statistical Area.

== History ==
In 1860, Judge John T. and Phebe J. (Finley) Porter moved to Illinois with their son Ebenezer F.(b. 1859 at New Salem, Fayette County, Pennsylvania), and located near Grand Ridge, LaSalle County, where they lived on a farm until 1872. Porter was at first a farmer, and afterward a lumberman and grain dealer. In 1872, he moved into the town of Grand Ridge, and built and operated two grain elevators. In 1882, he moved to Florida and engaged in the lumber business. He founded the town of Grand Ridge, Florida, naming it in honor of his old Illinois home.

In 1868, Nelson Jones (b. May 24, 1819, in Ross County, Ohio) bought two houses, two lots and a shop valued at $800; he was the first blacksmith in Grand Ridge Village. In 1870, the Fox River Division of the Chicago, Burlington and Quincy (CB&Q) Railroad was completed and put in operation. The first business house was built by E. Core the same year.

There are contradicting accounts of the Presbyterian establishment. According to Church Archives of Cumberland Presbyterian Church, in the spring of 1870, Robert Morgan (born August 18, 1838), son of Caleb and Nancy Antram, and Sarah Woodward moved to Grand Ridge, LaSalle County, Illinois with 4-year-old son Caleb Ewing Antram (born February 12, 1865) after their daughter Laura died in March 1868 at just 6 years old. William, Nellie, Mary E., Joseph W., Lewis W. and Ethel May were all born to the couple while living on the Antram homestead from 1869 to 1912.

In 1871, Cumberland Presbyterian was organized in Grand Ridge, Illinois, where Robert M. Antram was an elder ever since. From 1886 to 1891, it was known as Hudson Church. Membership numbered 145 in 1890 and church structure was erected that year. In 1891, the name changed to Grand Ridge by action of Mackinaw Presbytery. R. M. Antram was Clerk of the Session and Post Office until 1907, when the organization became defunct and did not participate in reunion with Presbyterian Church USA.

Another account holds that the Presbyterian church in Grand Ridge was organized June 17, 1865, in the Van Doren school house, by a committee from the Peoria Presbytery, consisting of the Rev. Robert Johnson and Rev. John Marquis. The original members were Wm. McMillan, Jane B. McMillan, Araminta Poundstone, Joseph Boyd, Elvira Boyd, J. T. Van Doren, Sarah C. Van Doren, James H. Boyd and Isabella Boyd. Other founding Families were Sutton, Farnham and Long. The house of worship was erected in 1864, at an expense of $1,800, and soon after, a parsonage, costing $800. The first pastor was Rev. John Moore, who remained some time.

In 1874, the owners of the land on either side of the road, David Crumrine and Joseph Boyd laid off a part of their respective lands adjoining the track, in town lots, after which building was commended on a more extended scale and now it is a very handsome farm village, and is a point from which large amount of grain and product finds its way to market. In the latter part of 1876, Porter sold his elevator to F. McIlvaine. E. Cole conducts another elevator, and it is estimated that in 1877 at least 1,200 car loads of grain we shipped annually. In 1871, F. H. Poundstone erected the second business house. In June 1873, Garrison & Hornick opened a first class dry goods, notion and grocery house, meeting with lucrative return. In 1877, it was estimated that aggregate business of Grand Ridge Village would amount to $75,000 annually. In 1877, there were nine business houses, two physicians and a proportionate number of mechanics in Grand Ridge.

In 1875, The Victor Lodge, No. 578, Independent Order of Odd Fellows (IOOF) was instituted on June 11 and met every Saturday evening through at least 1877.

In 1903, the First National Bank of Grand Ridge was organized by Thomas Dean Catlin, banker and capitalist residing in Ottawa, Illinois (born in Clinton, New York, on March 12, 1838, son of Marcus and Philena Hunt (Dean) Catlin.

== Geography ==
According to the 2021 census gazetteer files, Grand Ridge has a total area of 0.46 square miles (1.19 km^{2}), all land.

== Demographics ==
Historical population
Census	Pop.	Note	%±
1880	135		—
1890	328		143.0%
1900	392		19.5%
1910	403		2.8%
1920	389		−3.5%
1930	367		−5.7%
1940	385		4.9%
1950	530		37.7%
1960	659		24.3%
1970	698		5.9%
1980	684		−2.0%
1990	560		−18.1%
2000	546		−2.5%
2010	560		2.6%
2020	515		−8.0%
U.S. Decennial Census

As of the 2020 census there were 515 people, 252 households, and 187 families residing in the village. The population density was 1,114.72 inhabitants per square mile (430.40/km^{2}). There were 224 housing units at an average density of 484.85 per square mile (187.20/km^{2}). The racial makeup of the village was 93.79% White, 0.19% Asian, and 6.02% from two or more races. Hispanic or Latino of any race were 7.18% of the population.

There were 252 households, out of which 30.6% had children under the age of 18 living with them, 54.37% were married couples living together, 18.65% had a female householder with no husband present, and 25.79% were non-families. 23.81% of all households were made up of individuals, and 15.48% had someone living alone who was 65 years of age or older. The average household size was 3.01 and the average family size was 2.58.

The village's age distribution consisted of 23.7% under the age of 18, 11.2% from 18 to 24, 25.9% from 25 to 44, 21.6% from 45 to 64, and 17.7% who were 65 years of age or older. The median age was 39.1 years. For every 100 females, there were 94.6 males. For every 100 females age 18 and over, there were 90.8 males.

The median income for a household in the village was $58,056, and the median income for a family was $71,750. Males had a median income of $41,964 versus $24,750 for females. The per capita income for the village was $26,429. About 2.1% of families and 3.5% of the population were below the poverty line, including 2.6% of those under age 18 and 7.0% of those age 65 or over.

== Grand Ridge Grade School ==
Grand Ridge Grade School is governed by Superintendent Adam Kueltzo and Principal Terry Ahearn. The school's mascot is a Mohawk Indian. School colors are maroon, gold, and white. The 7th grade girls basketball team was 4th in state out of 88 teams in the 2007 season. The academic team took second place at the regional tournament in the 2008 season.

== Notable people ==
- Scotty Bowers, Hollywood pimp
- Bill Essick, pitcher for the Cincinnati Reds
- John Huston Finley, Editor in Chief of The New York Times and Commissioner of Education of the State of New York
