= Clive Day =

American academic (1871–1951)

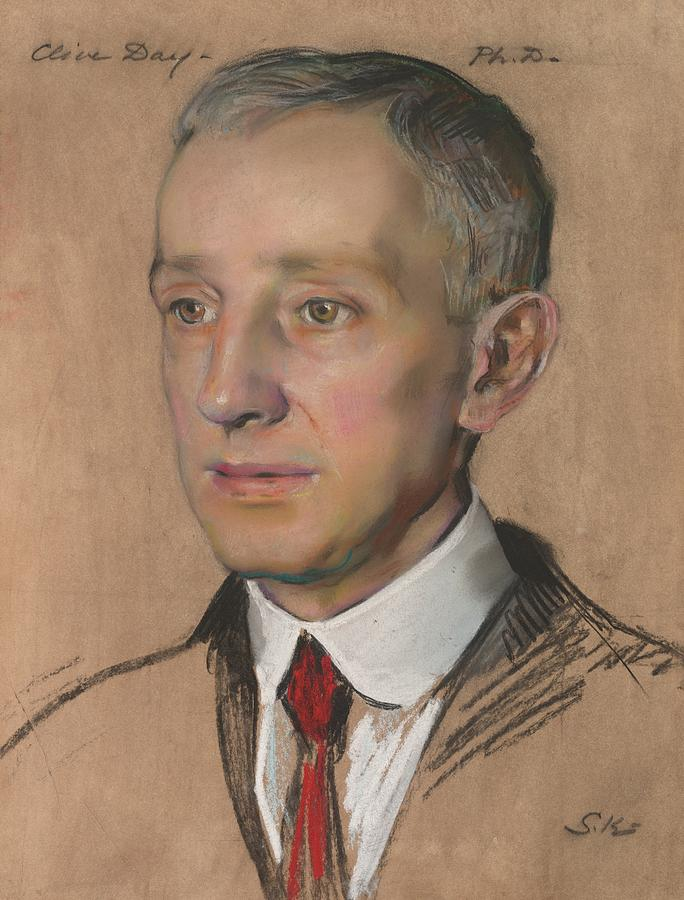
Clive Day by William Sergeant Kendall

Clive Hart Day (February 11, 1871 – July 27, 1951) was an American college professor and the author of History of Commerce. He was chief of the Balkan Division of the American Commission to Negotiate Peace in Paris in 1918–19.

Day was born in Hartford, Connecticut. He graduated from Yale University in 1892, where he was a member of Skull and Bones, and won the John Addison Porter Prize. He took postgraduate studies at the Humboldt University of Berlin and the University of Paris. Day taught history and economics at the University of California, Berkeley for three years and economics at Sheffield Scientific School for two years. In 1907 he was appointed professor of economic history at Yale University.

== Publications ==
- The Policy and Administration of the Dutch in Java. Macmillan. 1904.
- History of Commerce (1907; revised and enlarged edition, 1922)
- The Question of the Balkans, a brochure (1920)
- Economic Development in Modern Europe. Macmillan. 1933
