= Sidney Edward Mezes =

American philosopher (1863–1931)

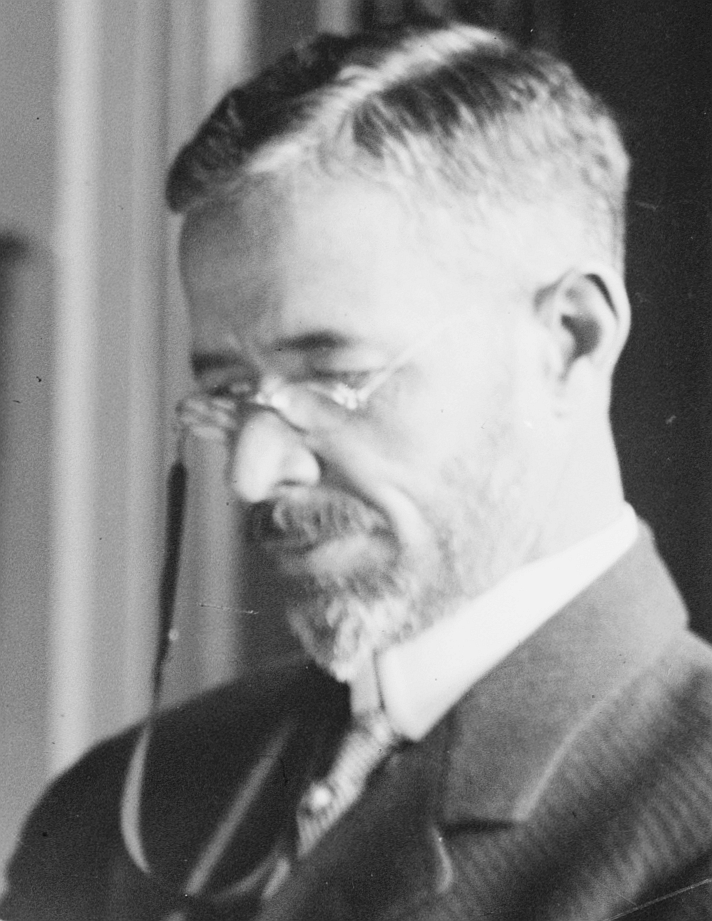

5th President of the University of Texas at Austin
- In office 1908–1914
- Preceded by: David Franklin Houston
- Succeeded by: William James Battle

4th President of City College of New York
- In office 1914–1927
- Preceded by: John Huston Finley
- Succeeded by: Frederick Bertrand Robinson

Personal details
- Born: October 19, 1863 Belmont, California
- Died: September 10, 1931 (aged 67) Pasadena, California
- Education: University of California, Berkeley; Harvard University

Sidney Edward Mezes (September 23, 1863 – September 10, 1931) was an American philosopher.

== Biography ==
He was born in what is now the town of Belmont, California, on September 23, 1863, to a Spanish-born father and Italian-born mother. He graduated in 1884 from the University of California, Berkeley in engineering and was a member of Chi Phi fraternity. After returning to university, he earned a doctorate in philosophy from Harvard University in 1893. From 1893 to 1894 he taught philosophy at the University of Chicago. From 1894 he was in positions at the University of Texas for 20 years, becoming a professor there in 1906. From 1908 he was president of the University.

In 1914 he became president of the College of the City of New York. In 1917 he was appointed as director of the Inquiry, a think tank set up by Woodrow Wilson to study the diplomatic position that would follow a victorious end to World War I. He was part of the American Commission to Negotiate Peace at the Treaty of Versailles in 1919.

In 1896, he married Annie Olive Hunter, a sister-in-law of Edward M. House.

He died on September 10, 1931, in Pasadena, California.

== Works ==
- The Conception of God, A Philosophical Discussion Concerning the Nature of the Divine Idea as a Demonstrable Reality (1897) with Josiah Royce, Joseph Le Conte, George Holmes Howison
- Ethics, Descriptive and Explanatory (1901)
- What Really Happened at Paris, edited by Charles Seymour and Edward Mandell House (1921) contributor

== See also ==
- American philosophy
- List of American philosophers
