= Ebenezer F. Porter =

Kansas businessman and politician

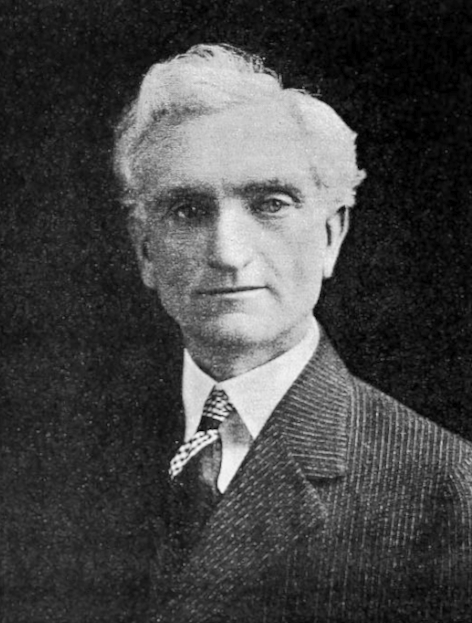

Member of the Kansas Senate
- In office 1901–1915

Personal details
- Born: Ebenezer Finley Porter; July 14, 1859 New Salem, Pennsylvania, US
- Died: November 23, 1919 (aged 60) Pittsburg, Kansas, US
- Resting place: Highland Park Cemetery
- Party: Republican
- Spouse: Anna I. Berry (m. 1882)
- Children: 3
- Occupation: Businessman, politician

Ebenezer Finley Porter (July 14, 1859 – November 23, 1919) was an American lumber businessman and Republican state legislator in Kansas.

== Biography ==
Porter was born in New Salem, Pennsylvania on July 14, 1859 and moved to Kansas in 1885. He married Anna I. Berry on February 23, 1882, and they had three children.

He served in the Kansas Senate from 1901-1915. He was a Republican. He lived in Pittsburg, Kansas and managed a lumber company. His father John T. Porter owned a Republican newspaper in West Florida.

Porter invested in land in Northwest Florida for his lumber business. He renamed Goodrange to Holt, Florida for one of his sons and tried to rename Holt, Florida for his other son Houston.

Porter sponsored legislation to establish a Manual Training Normal School in Pittsburg, Kansas and supported appropriating funds for the college's Russ Hall. Porter Hall at what is now Pittsburg State University is named for him.

Porter died at his home in Pittsburg on November 23, 1919, and was buried at Highland Park Cemetery.
