= Two Egg, Florida =

- Unincorporated community
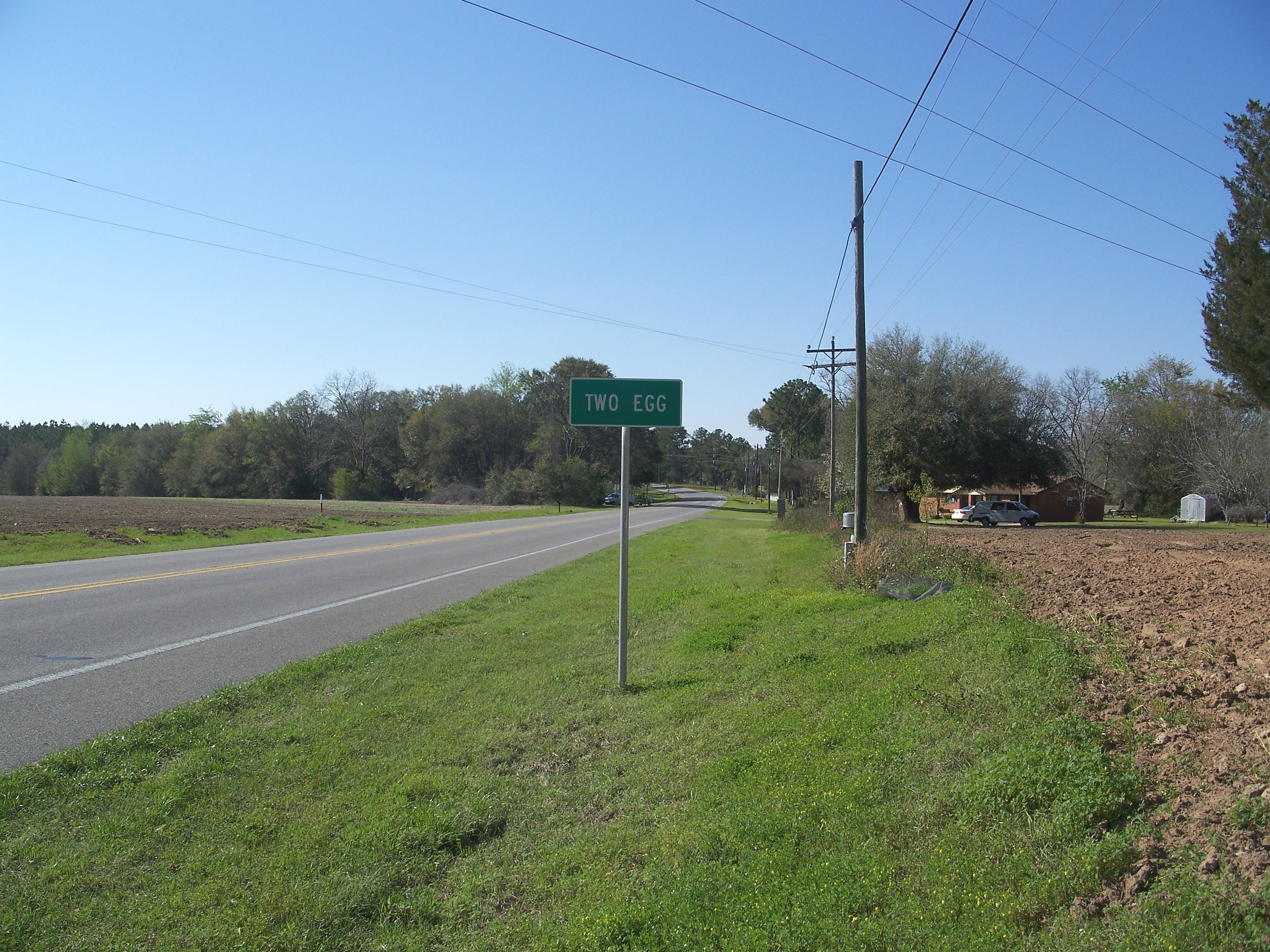
- Eastern limits, along SR 69

- Location within Florida Location within the United States
- Coordinates: 30°51′10″N 85°4′35″W
- Country: United States
- State: Florida
- County: Jackson
- Elevation: 135 ft (41 m)
- Time zone: UTC-6 (Central (CST))
  - Summer (DST): UTC-5 (CDT)
- GNIS feature ID: 295680

Two Egg is a small unincorporated community in Jackson County, Florida, United States. More precisely, it is a few miles northeast of Marianna and not far from the Chattahoochee River, which partly forms the state line with Georgia.

Settlement of the area dates back to just before the American Civil War, but the area served as a crossroads between Native Americans and European settlers in the 18th century due to trading posts along the Chattahoochee River. The origin of the name Two Egg is obscure. Some believe poor families during the Great Depression would trade eggs for goods at the local store, while others say two eggs were dropped by accident, causing the name to be selected. Two Egg's unusual name has attracted attention of writers. Regardless of the name's origin, Two Egg first appeared on state maps in 1940.

== Geography ==
Two Egg is a small unincorporated community in northeast Jackson County, Florida, near the Chattahoochee River, which forms part of the state line with Georgia. The community is also located a few miles from Marianna. The Geographic Names Information System lists Two Egg's elevation at 135 feet (41 m) above sea-level.

== History ==
While Florida Memory described Two Egg as "little more than a wide spot on a curve of State Road 69" in 2014, the area served as an important crossroads as far back as the 18th century. During that time, European settlers and people of the Creek tribe established trails to trading posts along the Chattahoochee River. Thomas Perryman's trail stretched from that waterway to the Chipola River, passing through Two Egg. This path largely still exists, although with significant improvements and slight adjustments. Two families settled there not long before the American Civil War and applied for a post office with the name "Allison". However, the post office only lasted about a year and subsequently mail was handled via Dellwood.

The name Two Egg first appeared during the 1930s. However, its exact origin is unknown. Some believe poor families during the Great Depression would trade eggs for goods at the local store, while others say two eggs were dropped by accident, causing the name to be selected. In another theory, people suggested that store owners or children may have stated that the community would never be "more than a two-egg town." Two Egg's unusual name has attracted attention of writers. Regardless of the name's origin, Two Egg officially began appearing on state maps in the 1940s. Faye Dunaway lived in the community before starting her career as a Hollywood actress.
