= David Hunter Miller =

American lawyer

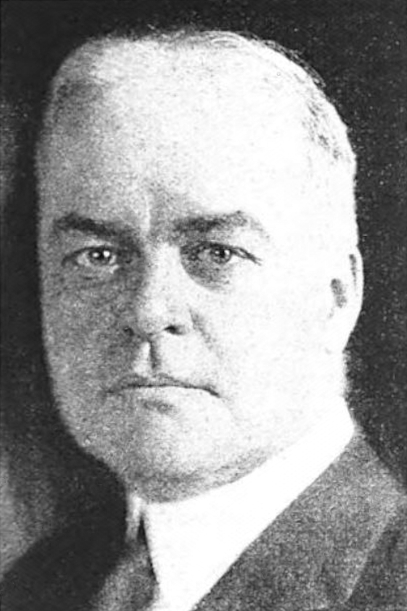
- In Current History in 1928

4th Department of State Historian
- In office 1931–1933
- Preceded by: Tyler Dennett
- Succeeded by: Cyril Wynne

Personal details
- Born: January 2, 1875 New York, New York, US
- Died: July 21, 1961 (aged 86) Washington, D.C., US

David Hunter Miller (1875–1961) was a US lawyer and an expert on treaties who participated in the drafting of the covenant of the League of Nations.

He practiced law in New York City from 1911 to 1929; served on the Inquiry, a body of experts that collected data for the Paris Peace Conference (1917–1919); and was legal adviser to the American commission to the conference.

As an officer of the US Department of State (1929–1944), Miller headed the American delegation to the 1930 Hague Conference for the codification of international law. His published works include My Diary at the Conference of Paris, with Documents (21 vol., 1924–26) and Treaties and Other International Acts of the United States of America (8 vol., 1931–1948).

Miller was an elected member of the American Philosophical Society (1928).

== Biography ==
David Hunter Miller was born in New York City on January 2, 1875.

He died at his home in Washington, D.C. on July 21, 1961.

== Partial bibliography ==
- Miller, David Hunter (1948), Treaties and Other International Acts of the United States of America, U.S. G.P.O.
- Miller, David Hunter (1921), International Relations of Labor, A. A. Knopf
- Miller, David Hunter (1928), The Drafting of the Covenant, G.P. Putnam's Sons
- Miller, David Hunter; Frank Billings Kellogg; Aristide Briand (1928), The Peace Pact of Paris: A Study of the Briand-Kellogg Treaty, G. P. Putnam's sons
- Miller, David Hunter (1925), The Geneva Protocol, The Macmillan company
- Miller, David Hunter (1918), Secret Statutes of the United States: A Memorandum by David Hunter, Govt. print. off.
- Miller, David Hunter (1924), My diary at the Conference of Paris: With documents (22 vols.), New York
