= Nemours (disambiguation) =

Nemours may refer to:

== Art ==
- Portrait of Giuliano de' Medici, Duke of Nemours, a 16th-century marble sculpture by Michelangelo

== Buildings ==
- Château de Nemours, a castle in France
- Nemours Estate, a mansion in the United States

== Geography ==
=== France ===
- Nemours, a commune in France
- Faÿ-lès-Nemours, a commune in France
- Saint-Pierre-lès-Nemours, a commune in France
- Canton of Nemours, a French administrative division

=== Algeria ===
- Ghazaouet, a commune in northwestern Algeria formerly known as Nemours during French colonial rule
- Nemours-Nedroma, a volcanic field in northwestern Algeria

=== United States ===
- Nemours, West Virginia, United States

== Healthcare ==
- Nemours Children's Health, an American healthcare system
  - Nemours Children's Hospital, Delaware
  - Nemours Children's Hospital, Florida
- Nemours Foundation, an American nonprofit organization

== People ==
- Duke of Nemours, a French noble title
- Alfred Auguste Nemours (1883–1955), Haitian military general
- Aurelie Nemours (1910–2005), French painter
- Charles Amadeus, Duke of Nemours (1624–1652), French military leader
- Charles Emmanuel de Savoie, Duke of Nemours (1567–1595), French governor and military commander
- Elizabeth de Vendome, Duchess of Savoy-Nemours (1614–1664), granddaughter of King Henry IV of France
- Entente Bagneaux-Fontainebleau-Nemours, French football club
- Gaston of Foix, Duke of Nemours (1489–1512), French nobleman
- Giuliano de' Medici, Duke of Nemours (1479–1516), Italian nobleman
- Henri I, Duke of Nemours (1572–1632), French nobleman
- Henri II, Duke of Nemours (1625–1659), French nobleman
- Jacques d'Armagnac, Duke of Nemours (1433–1477), French nobleman
- Jacques de Savoie, Duke of Nemours (1531–1585), French governor and military commander
- Jean d'Armagnac, Duke of Nemours (1467–1500), French nobleman
- Joseph Nemours Pierre-Louis (1900–1966), acting president of Haiti from 1956 to 1957
- Louis d'Armagnac, Duke of Nemours (1472–1503), French nobleman
- Louis I, Duke of Nemours (1615–1641), French nobleman
- Marie de Nemours (1625–1707), French noblewoman
- Marie Jeanne Baptiste of Savoy-Nemours (1644–1724), French noblewoman
- Philip, Duke of Nemours (1490–1533), French nobleman
- Pierre Samuel du Pont de Nemours (1739–1817), French-American writer
- Prince Charles Philippe, Duke of Nemours (1905–1970), French nobleman
- Prince Louis, Duke of Nemours (1814–1896), French nobleman

=== Given name ===
- Nemours Auguste (1850–1915), Haitian diplomat
- Nemours Jean-Baptiste (1918–1985), Haitian musician

== History ==
- Treaty of Nemours, a 1585 treaty signed during the French Wars of Religion

== Rail transport ==
- Nemours – Saint-Pierre station, a railway station in France
- Narrow gauge railways of the Nemours sand pits, railway lines in France

== See also ==
- Louis, Duke of Nemours (disambiguation)
- Nemours Children's Hospital (disambiguation)
