= Alfred I. duPont Testamentary Trust =

American charitable endowment for disabled children

- Abbreviation: AIDTT
- Formation: April 28, 1935; 91 years ago
- Type: Charitable foundation
- Purpose: Pediatric health
- Headquarters: Jacksonville, Florida, US
- Location: 510 Alfred Dupont Place
- Coordinates: 30.319935°N 81.673632°W
- Region served: Delaware, Florida, Pennsylvania & New Jersey
- Chairman: Hugh Durden
- Main organ: Board of Trustees
- Budget: 3% of endowment value
- Endowment: $ 8.2 billion
- Staff: 12
- Website: alfrediduponttrust.org

The Alfred I. duPont Testamentary Trust is a non-profit organization created by philanthropist Alfred Irénée du Pont in 1935, devoted to supporting the trust's sole charitable beneficiary, the Nemours Foundation. As of 2023, the organization stated it oversaw approximately $8.2 billion in assets.

== History ==
The Alfred I. duPont Testamentary Trust was created as per Alfred I. du Pont's will after his death in 1935.

It has been my firm conviction throughout life that it is the duty of everyone in the world to do what is within his power to alleviate human suffering. It is, therefore, natural that I should desire after having made provision for the immediate members of my family and others whom I have seen fit to remember, that the remaining portion of my estate be utilized for charitable needs.

— Will of Alfred I. du Pont

At the time, du Pont's assets included seven Florida National Banks, significant landholdings in Northwest Florida, E. I du Pont de Nemours Company shares, and the Nemours and Epping Forest estates. The value of the assets was approximately $40 million (equivalent to approximately $1.72 billion in 2014). The duPont Trustees, specifically du Pont's brother-in-law Edward Ball, created the St. Joe Paper Company and began operating a paper mill in 1938. The trust had a 1939 value of $72.5 million.

Du Pont's will specifically requested funds be used to help disabled children. In 1940, funds from the trust were used to open the Alfred I. duPont Hospital for Children in duPont's hometown of Wilmington, Delaware.

After Alfred's widow Jessie Ball du Pont died in 1970, Ball arranged the sale of Epping Forest to his friend, Raymond K. Mason. Before Charter Company was broken up by bankruptcy in the late 1980s, Mason sold Epping Forest to Herb Peyton and Gate Petroleum in 1984. Peyton is presently a duPont trustee.

Before Ball's death, the trust and foundation signed a 1980 consent agreement with Delaware and Florida which stipulated that the Nemours Foundation would annually receive the greater of: 3 percent of the trust's net market value or the net annual income from the trust assets.

Additionally, at least 50 percent of Nemours funds must be spent in Delaware, and a $25 million contingency fund must be reserved for Delaware's operations.

== Nemours Foundation ==
The Nemours Foundation operates the Alfred I. duPont Hospital for Children in Wilmington; the Nemours Children's Hospital in Orlando; the Nemours Children's Clinics in Delaware, Florida, Pennsylvania and New Jersey; and the Nemours Mansion and Gardens.

== Leadership ==
Following Alfred du Pont's death in 1935, Edward Ball controlled the trust until his own death in 1981. W.L. Thornton, former CEO of St. Joe Company and Florida East Coast Industries, succeeded Ball and was chairman of the trust for 23 years. Hugh Durden, corporate trustee since 1997, now a retired executive from Wachovia Bank, was elected chairman on January 24, 2005.

== Trustees ==
Current
| Trustee | Began | Position |
|---|---|---|
| Hugh M. Durden | 1997 | Chairman |
| Winfred L. Thornton | 1967 | Past Chair |
| Herbert H. Peyton | 1995 | Vice Chair |
| John F. Porter, III | 1995 | |
| W. T. Thompson, III | 1995 | |
| John S. Lord | 2000 | |

Past
| Trustee | Years |
|---|---|
| Jessie Ball duPont | 1939 – 1970 |
| Ed Ball | 1939 – 1981 |
| Reginald S. Huidekoper | 1939 – 1943 |
| Elbert Dent | 1943 – 1965 |
| William B. Mills | 1965 – 1986 |
| Thomas S. Coldewey | 1965 – 1994 |

Past
| Trustee | Years |
|---|---|
| Alfred duPont Dent | 1965 – 1997 |
| A. L. Hargraves | 1965 – 1966 |
| Jacob C. Belin | 1967 – 2000 |
| | – |
| | – |
| | – |

== Major investments shift ==
The Trust was valued at $1.9 billion in January 1996. The St. Joe Company was originally owned by the duPont Trust. After the company went public, the duPont trust owned 70 percent of the 30.6 million shares outstanding. The company's stock did well, rising from 53 5/8 in February, 1995 to 115 1/2 in December, 1997. The corresponding trust value increased from $1.1 billion to $2.4 billion. The problem was that duPont's will stipulated an annual disbursement of the amount equal to 3 percent of the trust's value. St. Joe's annual dividend of 20¢ only generated $4.26 million and the required payout was over $72 million, so the trust was forced to sell 4 million shares to invest in a security producing substantially more income than St. Joe. That left a 57 percent stake, which was reduced by additional stock sales to 23 percent. On May 28, 2004, the trust filed paperwork to divest as many as 12 million more shares, leaving an 8 percent ownership.

On October 9, 2000, St. Joe divested its 54 percent interest in Florida East Coast Industries by distributing FECI Class B common shares to St. Joe shareholders; the DuPont Trust received a large block of FECI stock.

== Headquarters ==
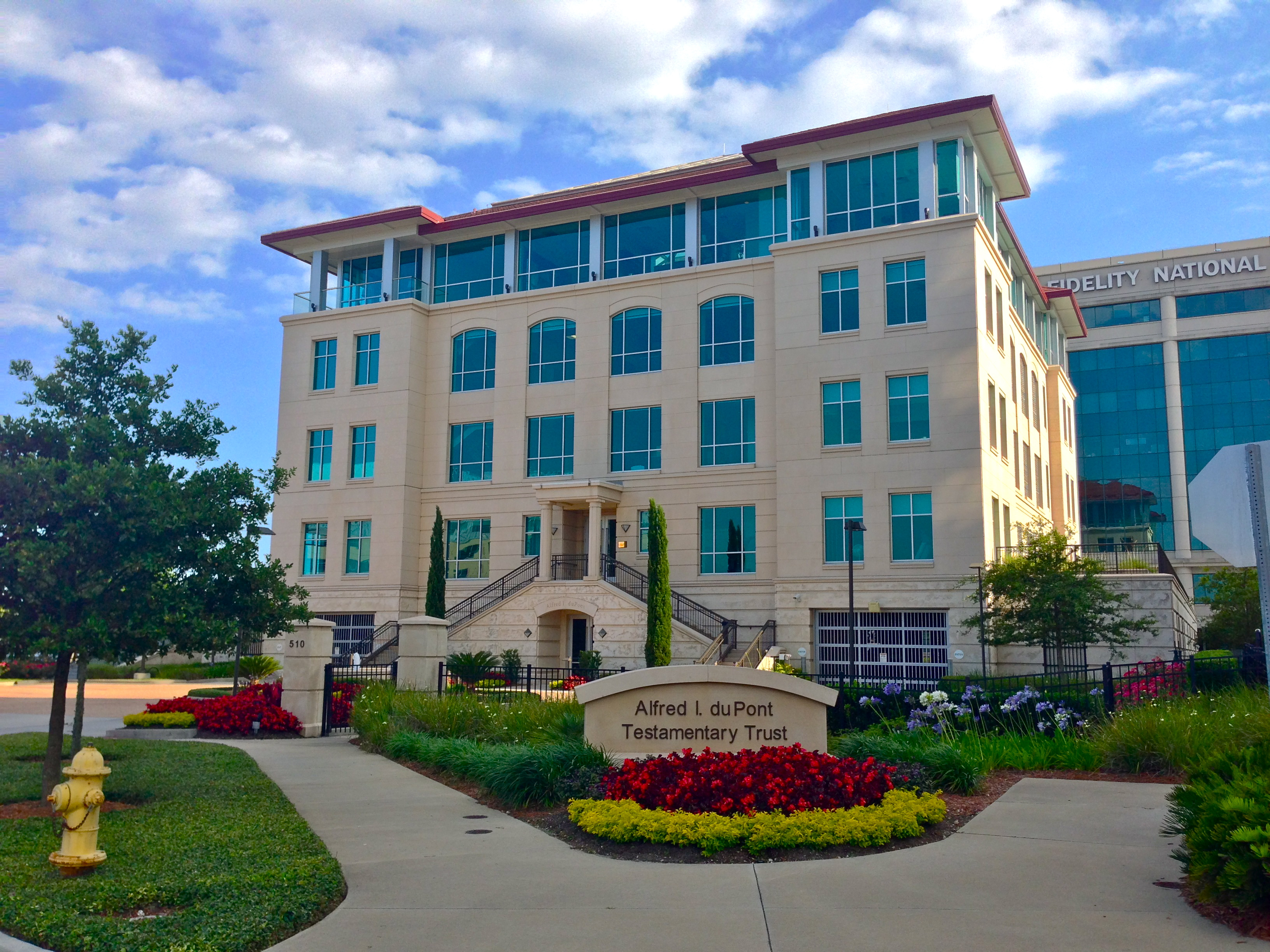
Alfred I. duPont Testamentary Trust Headquarters

For many years, the trust shared a building with the Nemours Foundation on Jacksonville's Southside.

The new headquarters of the trust is a 40,000-square-foot (3,700 m^{2}), five-floor building on the St. Johns riverfront in Jacksonville, Florida which was scheduled to open October 1, 2008. General contractor Elkins Constructors began work on the trust's new home on July 17, 2007; noted architect Graham Gund contributed to the design as a green building according to LEED standards for environmentally sustainable construction developed by the United States Green Building Council. The most outstanding aspect of the $20 million structure is its ability to conserve.

The building has a stone exterior, copious large windows, and was described in the local newspaper as "opulent." According to Hugh Durden, chairman of its board of trustees, "We were looking for a 100-year building...(with) timeless design that is both useful and enduring. If you're going to be here for decades, that becomes a cost-effective investment."

The bottom floor is a parking garage for workers, so that most of the property is landscaping, rather than parking lot. Three 10,000-gallon underground cisterns capture rainfall, which is then used for landscape irrigation, so a large retention pond is not required. The four-story atrium is capped by a pyramid-shaped skylight, flooding the interior of the building with sunshine and warmth during cool months. Some interior walls contain opaque glass to share light between areas; sensors turn off lights in unoccupied rooms. There is a bus stop within a block of the building, and bicycle storage plus locker rooms for cyclists. Lastly, heating and cooling systems are high efficiency and limit power usage during peak demand periods.

== Litigation ==
In June 2012, the State of Delaware filed suit against the trust, claiming the trustees were not following duPont's intentions and Delaware was not receiving its proper yearly distribution. Furthermore, Delaware Attorney General Beau Biden asserted that the $72 million renovation of the Nemours Mansion and Gardens in Wilmington should not have been included in Delaware's share of foundation distributions.

For several years, the trust had been making plans to split the $4 billion asset portfolio into two segments, with a small portion going to a taxable annuitants' trust for individuals named in duPont's will, and the majority of assets remaining in the tax-exempt charitable trust. Doing so would allow the foundation to avoid the yearly assessment of several million dollars in foreign taxes. The Delaware lawsuit may delay those plans until that litigation is resolved.

== See also ==
- Jessie Ball duPont Fund
