= Nemours Children's Hospital =

Nemours Children's Hospital may refer to either of the two following hospitals in the United States.

- Nemours Children's Hospital, Delaware (Wilmington, Delaware)
- Nemours Children's Hospital, Florida (Orlando, Florida)

== See also ==
- Nemours Children's Health
