= Bessie Gardner du Pont =

American historian (1864–1949)

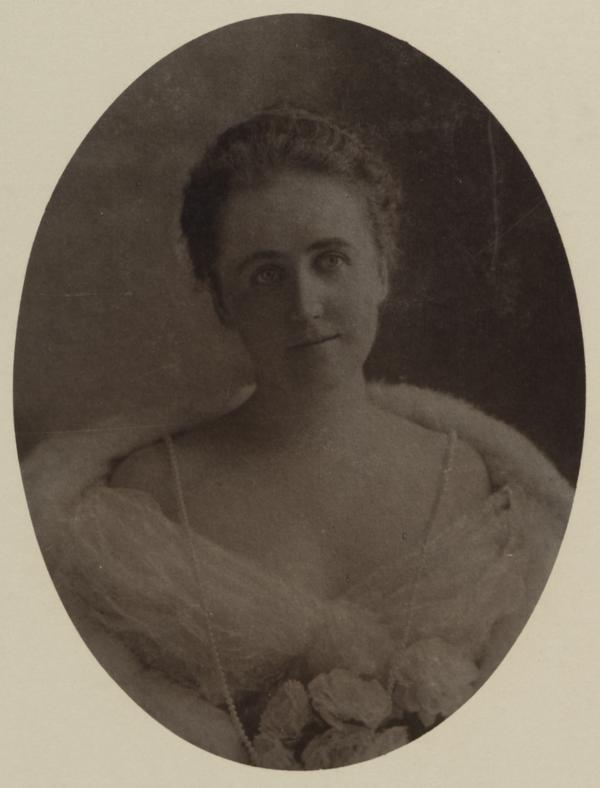
- Born: Elizabeth Gardner; September 11, 1864; Trenton, New Jersey, U.S.
- Died: December 12, 1949 (aged 85); Greenville, Delaware, U.S.
- Known for: Author; historian; translator
- Spouse: Alfred I. (A.I.) du Pont
- Children: 4

Bessie Gardner du Pont (1864–1949) was an American author and historian who wrote on the du Pont family and DuPont.

She was the daughter of Margaretta Potts Gardner and Dorsey Gardner, an etymologist, Yale professor, editor, and author. Bessie spent her formative years in New Haven, Connecticut before relocating to the Brandywine Valley of Delaware. On January 4, 1887, she wed her cousin, Alfred I. (A.I.) du Pont, at Church of St. James the Less in Philadelphia. Bessie's deep interest in her family's history led her to begin translating and compiling historical documents related to the du Pont family and their business in 1900. She and her husband lived at their Nemours estate.

As DuPont began to expand at the start of the 20th century, Alfred's union with Bessie deteriorated. For numerous reasons, what had started out as a pleasant marriage had grown difficult and strained. Bessie became increasingly estranged from Alfred and their children, creating friction within the du Pont family. Bessie and her husband had four children before divorcing Alfred in 1906: Bessie, Madeline, Victor, and Victorine du Pont. Encouraged by Pierre S. du Pont, she authored the notable history E. I. du Pont de Nemours and Company: A History, 1802-1902, published in 1920. After her divorce from Alfred, Bessie lived at her home, Chevannes.

== Published work included ==
- E.I. Du Pont de Nemours and Company, a history, 1802-1902.
- National education in the United States of America by Du Pont de Nemours; translated from the second French edition of 1812 and with an introduction by B. G. du Pont.
- Life of Eleuthère Irénée du Pont from Contemporary Correspondence.
- Lives of Victor and Josephine Du Pont.
- Autobiography of Du Pont de Nemours 1739-1817.
- Du Pont de Nemours 1739-1817.
