= Hugh Durden =

American banker (born 1943)

- Born: Hugh Michael Durden; April 15, 1943 (age 83); Gadsden, Alabama, US
- Education: Princeton University; Tulane University
- Occupation: Banker
- Political party: Republican
- Spouse: Jacqueline (Née Harwell)
- Children: 5

Hugh Durden (born 1943) is an American banker.

== Biography ==
=== Early life ===
Hugh Michael Durden was born April 15, 1943, in Gadsden, Alabama, but graduated from Marietta High School (Georgia) in 1961. He attended Princeton University, graduated in 1965, and was commissioned as an officer in the United States Navy. He spent five years from 1965 to 1970 as a naval aviator, including tours in the Vietnam War. After his military discharge, he spent two years at Brown University’s School of Business, earning an MBA in 1972. He married his wife, Jacqueline in 1967 and the union bore five children: Jacqueline, Hugh, Charles, Teresa, and Wendy.

=== Banking ===
During 1972, he was hired by Wachovia Bank and advanced to company president. In 1994 he was named president of Wachovia Corporate Services, a position he held until his retirement in 2001. and executive vice president of Wachovia Corporation.

=== Boards ===
In 1997, he was appointed as corporate trustee from Wachovia, serving on the board of the Alfred I. duPont Testamentary Trust and was elected to the board of directors of the Nemours Foundation in July, 1997. After retiring from Wachovia, Durden was elected as an individual trustee and chairman of the Alfred I. duPont Testamentary Trust in 2005, a position he still holds.

==== St. Joe ====
In 2000, he was elected to the board of the St. Joe Company where he chaired the compensation committee and was a member of the audit committee. He was elected board chairman and served from August, 2008 to March, 2011. He was interim CEO at St. Joe from March to June, 2011 and left the board in May, 2012.

==== Others ====
Durden is on the board of directors for Web.com Group and remains active in several non-profit organizations including Camp Boggy Creek and Chairman of the Investment for the EARTH of the EARTH University Foundation in Costa Rica. Chairman of the Board of Liberty Aerospace Company, Inc. He is a member of World Affairs Council Jacksonville.
