= Nemours Children's Health =

- Nemours Children's Health logo

Geography
- Location: Jacksonville, Florida; Orlando, Florida; Wilmington, Delaware, United States

Organization
- Type: Specialty – Pediatrics
- Patron: The Nemours Foundation

History
- Founded: 1940 by Alfred I. duPont

Links
- Website: www.nemours.org

Nemours Children's Health is a pediatric healthcare system in the United States that provides extensive medical services, research, and education for children and families.

Nemours provides direct patient care across multiple states, including Delaware, Florida, Pennsylvania, and New Jersey. Its major facilities are Nemours Children's Hospital, Delaware, Nemours Children's Hospital, Florida, and more than 70 specialty, primary, and urgent care locations.

== History ==
Nemours was founded in 1936 by the Nemours Foundation. The Nemours Foundation oversees and funds Nemours Children's Health. Alfred I. duPont was a key figure in establishing Nemours Children's Health. After a career in the family's gunpowder business, duPont turned his focus to charitable work.

Upon his death in 1935, the Alfred I. duPont Charitable Trust was established. A year later, his widow Jessie Ball duPont and the other trustees incorporated The Nemours Foundation in Jacksonville, Florida.

In 1940, the Alfred I. duPont Institute, a pediatric orthopedic hospital, opened on the grounds of the Nemours Estate in Wilmington, Delaware. In the first year of operation, nearly 200 children were hospitalized, and several hundred more received outpatient care.

By the 1950s, the hospital was gaining notoriety for its patient care as well as physician education and research. The growth of outpatient services and the need for more laboratories and classrooms led to the construction of a new wing, which was the first major building project since the hospital's opening. During the 1970s, the hospital transitioned from a strictly orthopedic facility to a full-service children's hospital.

Edward Ball, Jessie Ball duPont's younger brother, also played a significant role in managing the assets of Alfred I. duPont's estate and the Nemours Foundation. After his death in 1981, a substantial portion of his wealth was bequeathed to the foundation, significantly contributing to the expansion of Nemours' services, particularly in Florida.

Nemours is one of the largest children's health systems in the United States, providing care to nearly 500,000 children annually in facilities in Delaware and Orlando, Florida, along with 72 primary and specialty care practices.

The hospital expanded throughout Florida in the 1990s, opening Nemours Children's Clinic locations in Jacksonville, Orlando, and Pensacola. In 2012, Nemours Children's Hospital, Florida opened in Orlando.

Nemours Children's Health opened a specialty care and ambulatory surgical center in Malvern, Pennsylvania in March 2024. Nemours Children's Health, Malvern has 18 medical and outpatient surgical specialties, including a concussion program, developmental medicine, a sleep center, and a surgical center.

== Education ==
During the early 2000s, Nemours expanded its program of clinical care, education, research, and postgraduate training to address population health, disparities in care, and the social determinants of children's health.

The organization partners with leading academic institutions to offer comprehensive medical education programs. In 2017, Nemours Children's Hospital, Florida established its own Nemours Children's Hospital Residency Program and, in partnership with the University of Central Florida's College of Education, started PedsAcademy, the first hospital-based inpatient education and teacher training program.

== Research ==
Nemours operates major research centers and laboratories, fostering partnerships with academic institutions and companies. Nemours has secured significant funding from the National Institutes of Health (NIH) and other grants.

== See also ==
- List of children's hospitals in the United States
- Nemours Foundation
- Nemours Children's Hospital, Delaware
- Nemours Children's Hospital, Florida
