= Hurstville (disambiguation) =

Hurstville is a suburb of Sydney, New South Wales, Australia.

Hurstville may also refer to:

- City of Hurstville, a former local government area in New South Wales, of which Hurstville was the seat
- Hurstville Historic District, a historic district and former town in Iowa, United States
- Hurstville, New York, a hamlet in New York, United States
- Hurstville (Kilmarnock, Virginia), a historic plantation house in Virginia, United States

== See also ==
- Hurstville railway station, a train station on the Illawarra line in Hurstville, New South Wales
- South Hurstville, a suburb of Sydney, Australia
