= Theodore B. Starr =

- Type: Private
- Industry: Silversmithing
- Founded: 1862
- Founder: Theodore Starr
- Defunct: 1923
- Fate: Acquired by Reed and Barton (1918); ceased operations in 1923
- Headquarters: New York City, New York, U.S.
- Key people: Theodore Starr
- Products: Silverware, bronze sculptures, decorative arts

Theodore B. Starr was a company of silversmiths founded in New York in 1862 by Theodore Starr. In 1864, he was joined by Herman Marcus, and the company became known as Starr and Marcus. Marcus left to join Tiffany's in 1877, and Starr bought back control of the company, with the name of the company becoming Theodore B. Starr. The company was incorporated in 1907 by Starr's son, before being bought in 1918 by Reed and Barton, a silver firm, and finally closing in 1923.

Starr encouraged Henry Schrady to cast miniature bronzes that the company could cast from and sell copies of. The bronzes Schrady made were among the first in the US to use the lost-wax process. It was in Starr's gallery that Karl Bitter first saw Schrady's work, and hired him to make larger versions of his bull moose and elk buffalo sculptures to be shown at the 1901 Pan-American Exposition. One cast of the bull moose can be found in the Metropolitan Museum of Art's collection.

Theodore B. Starr also sold casts of bronzes by Henri Crenier and was the dealer for the work of Solon Borglum.
