= Vinay M. Nadkarni =

American pediatrician

Vinay Nadkarni
- Spouse: Dr. Ellen Deutsch
- Children: 3

Academic background
- Education: BSc, Zoology, 1979, Duke University; MS, Physiology, 1980, Georgetown University; MD, 1984, University of Maryland School of Medicine

Academic work
- Institutions: Hospital of the University of Pennsylvania; Perelman School of Medicine at the University of Pennsylvania; Children's Hospital of Philadelphia; Nemours Alfred I. duPont Hospital for Children
- Main interests: Resuscitation

Vinay M. Nadkarni is an American pediatric critical care physician. He is a Professor of Anesthesiology and Critical Care at the Hospital of the University of Pennsylvania and the Medical Director of the Center for Simulation, Advanced Education and Innovation at the Children's Hospital of Philadelphia (CHOP). Nadkarni also holds the institution's Endowed Chair in Pediatric Critical Care Medicine and is a Fellow of the American College of Critical Care Medicine, the American Academy of Pediatrics, and the American Heart Association.

== Early life and education ==
Nadkarni was born to Indian immigrant parents Moreshwar V. Nadkarni and Goldie Nadkarni. He completed his Bachelor of Science degree in Zoology from Duke University in 1979 before enrolling at Georgetown University for his Master's degree in Physiology. Following this, he completed his medical degree at the University of Maryland School of Medicine and finished his residency and fellowship at Children's National Medical Center.

== Career ==
Upon completing his formal education, Nadkarni was offered the director's job at Christiana Hospital's pediatric intensive care unit. Prior to accepting the position, he and his wife spent a month treating children in underdeveloped countries through Operation Smile. During his time in Delaware, Nadkarni received three major Society of Critical Care Medicine research awards: the 1990 National In-Training Award, the 1999 National Neuroscience Specialty Award, and the 2003 National Pediatric Specialty Award. In 1996, while working at Nemours Alfred I. duPont Hospital for Children, he helped start a Delaware chapter of Operation Smile that is raising money for missions. One of their first events was a 5K runwalk and family gathering at the Alfred I. du Pont Institute in Rockland. As a result of his academic accomplishments, Nadkarni was chosen as the Co-chair of the 2005 International Consensus Conference on Emergency Cardiovascular Care and Resuscitation Science and helped to organize the American Heart Association (AHA) Science Symposia for three years. In recognition of his efforts with Operation Smile, Nadkarni received the 2008 Operation Smile Excellence In Pediatrics Award.

In November 2013, Nadkarni received the Distinguished Career Award from the American Academy of Pediatrics for his "commitment to the discovery, translation, and implementation of shock, trauma, and resuscitation science." Early in the year, Nadkarni and Robert A. Berg contributed to a study published in Circulation that showed extending cardiopulmonary resuscitation longer than 20 minutes could save lives in children and adults. They reached this conclusion after analyzing the hospital records of 3,419 children in the United States and Canada from 2000 through 2009 to find that more children than expected survived after prolonged CPR. This challenged the conventional thinking has been that CPR is futile after 20 minutes. Following the Circulation study's publication, Nadkarni contributed to or led a number of other studies, including investigations of improving chest compression quality supported by a quantitative analysis of CPR in children during in-hospital cardiac arrests.

On July 1, 2015, Nadkarni was promoted to Professor of Anesthesiology and Critical Care at the Hospital of the University of Pennsylvania and the Children's Hospital of Philadelphia in the Standing Faculty—Clinician-Educator of the Perelman School of Medicine at the University of Pennsylvania. In the same year, he was also named the ILCOR GIANT from the International Liaison Committee on Resuscitation (ILCOR). Following his promotion, Nadkarni was the recipient of the American Heart Association's Lifetime Achievement Award in recognition of his "outstanding sustained contributions to the cardiac arrest resuscitation science field." When speaking of Nadkarni, Chief Scientific Officer and Chair of the Department of Biomedical and Health Informatics at CHOP Bryan Wolf said: "I can think of no better person to receive this award."

As Co-Chair of International Liaison Committee on Resuscitation, Nadkarni collaborated with GVK EMRI, an emergency healthcare provider, to launch an initiative aimed to train and educate people on techniques to stop severe bleeding among accident victims. The initiative was called the Active Bleeding Control (ABC) Project and it trained over 100 volunteers including police personnel, auto and bus drivers, students, members from voluntary organizations, petrol bunk staff, and local shop owners. By 2018, Nadkarni was the only pediatrician to lead the ILCOR as co-chair and he set up national networks with the AHA's National Registry of CPR (Get with the Guidelines-Resuscitation) to provide data to over 300 hospitals in the country. He continued to work with the AHA and chaired their Emergency Cardiovascular Care Committee.

During the COVID-19 pandemic in North America, Nadkarni published research on how to best allocate standard life-saving medical resources when escalating demand outstrips supply. He is also a Fellow of the American College of Critical Care Medicine, the American Academy of Pediatrics, and the American Heart Association and serves on the Society of Critical Care Medicine executive committee.

== Personal life ==
Nadkarni and his wife, Dr. Ellen Deutsch, have three children together. Deutsch is a pediatric Otolaryngologist practicing in Delaware and specializing in laryngotracheal reconstruction.
