= SS Alfred I. Dupont =

Liberty ship of WWII

History

United States
- Name: Alfred I. Dupont
- Namesake: Alfred I. Dupont
- Owner: War Shipping Administration (WSA)
- Operator: International Freighting Corp.
- Ordered: as type (EC2-S-C1) hull, MC hull 2490
- Awarded: 23 April 1943
- Builder: St. Johns River Shipbuilding Company, Jacksonville, Florida
- Cost: $1,063,551
- Yard number: 54
- Way number: 6
- Laid down: 1 July 1944
- Launched: 15 August 1944
- Sponsored by: Jessie Ball duPont
- Completed: 28 August 1944
- Identification: Call sign: WSPY
- Fate: Laid up in the National Defense Reserve Fleet, Mobile, Alabama, 25 November 1947; Sold for scrapping, 13 May 1970, withdrawn from fleet, 13 August 1970

General characteristics
- Class & type: Liberty ship; type EC2-S-C1, standard
- Tonnage: 10,865 LT DWT; 7,176 GRT
- Displacement: 3,380 long tons (3,434 t) (light); 14,245 long tons (14,474 t) (max)
- Length: 441 feet 6 inches (135 m) oa; 416 feet (127 m) pp; 427 feet (130 m) lwl
- Beam: 57 feet (17 m)
- Draft: 27 ft 9.25 in (8.4646 m)
- Installed power: 2 × Oil fired 450 °F (232 °C) boilers, operating at 220 psi (1,500 kPa); 2,500 hp (1,900 kW)
- Propulsion: 1 × triple-expansion steam engine, (manufactured by Filer and Stowell, Milwaukee, Wisconsin); 1 × screw propeller
- Speed: 11.5 knots (21.3 km/h; 13.2 mph)
- Capacity: 562,608 cubic feet (15,931 m^{3}) (grain); 499,573 cubic feet (14,146 m^{3}) (bale)
- Complement: 38–62 USMM; 21–40 USNAG
- Armament: Varied by ship; Bow-mounted 3-inch (76 mm)/50-caliber gun; Stern-mounted 4-inch (102 mm)/50-caliber gun; 2–8 × single 20-millimeter (0.79 in) Oerlikon anti-aircraft (AA) cannons and/or, 2–8 × 37-millimeter (1.46 in) M1 AA guns

SS Alfred I. Dupont was a Liberty ship built in the United States during World War II. She was named after Alfred I. Dupont, an American industrialist, financier, philanthropist and a member of the influential Du Pont family.

== Construction ==
Alfred I. Dupont was laid down on 1 July 1944, under a Maritime Commission (MARCOM) contract, MC hull 2490, by the St. Johns River Shipbuilding Company, Jacksonville, Florida; she was sponsored by Jessie Ball duPont, the widow of the namesake, and was launched on 15 August 1944.

== History ==
She was allocated to the International Freighting Corp., on 28 August 1944. On 25 November 1947, she was laid up in the National Defense Reserve Fleet, Mobile, Alabama. She was sold for scrapping, 13 May 1970, to Southern Scrap Material Co., Ltd., along with SS Jonathan Grout, for $63,777. She was removed from the fleet, 13 August 1970.

== Bibliography ==
- "St. John's River Shipbuilding, Jacksonville FL". www.ShipbuildingHistory.com. 16 October 2010.
- Maritime Administration. "Alfred I. Dupont". Ship History Database Vessel Status Card. U.S. Department of Transportation, Maritime Administration.
- Davies, James (May 2004). "Specifications (As-Built)" (PDF). p. 23.
- "SS Alfred I. Dupont".
