= Shiloh School =

- U.S. National Register of Historic Places
- Virginia Landmarks Register
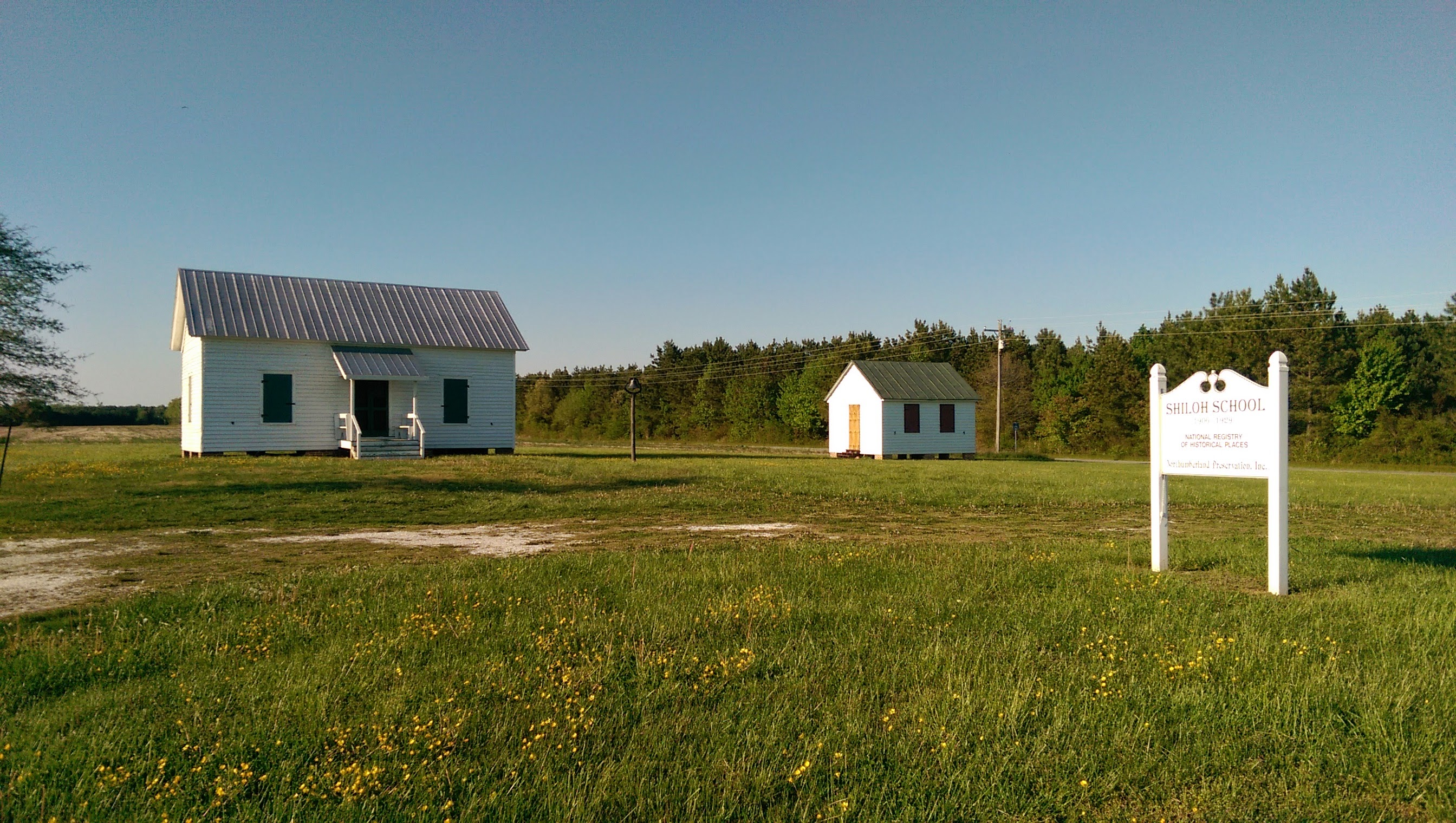

- Location within Virginia Location within the United States
- Location: Jct. of VA 605 and VA 606, near Kilmarnock, Virginia
- Coordinates: 37°46′5″N 76°19′51″W
- Area: less than one acre
- Built: 1906
- Built by: Kent, Elliot F.
- NRHP reference No.: 91001976
- VLR No.: 066-0034

Significant dates
- Added to NRHP: January 22, 1992
- Designated VLR: June 19, 1991

Shiloh School is a historic one-room school building located near Kilmarnock, Lancaster County, Virginia. It was built in 1906, and is a one-story, three-bay, simple frame building measuring 20 feet by 34 feet. It sits on a brick foundation and has a standing seam metal gable roof. Jessie Ball duPont (1884-1970) taught at the school in 1906–1907. It was used as a schoolhouse until 1929, and subsequently used for farm storage.

It was listed on the National Register of Historic Places in 1992.
