= Louis, Duke of Nemours (disambiguation) =

Prince Louis, Duke of Nemours (1814–1896) was second son of King Louis Philippe I of France and Maria Amalia of Naples and Sicily.

Louis, Duke of Nemours may also refer to:

- Louis d'Armagnac, Duke of Nemours (1472–1503)
- Louis I, Duke of Nemours (1615–1641)
- Louis, Duke of Orléans (born 1703), died 1752, who held the title Duke of Nemours among others

== See also ==
- Nemours (disambiguation)
