= Jessie Ball duPont =

American teacher and philanthropist (1884–1970)

- Portrait, 1910
- Born: Jessie Dew Ball; January 20, 1884; Hardings, Virginia, U.S.
- Died: September 27, 1970 (aged 86); Wilmington, Delaware, U.S.
- Education: Farmville Normal School
- Occupations: Teacher; philanthropist
- Years active: 1923–1970
- Employer: Alfred I. duPont Testamentary Trust
- Known for: Jessie Ball duPont Fund
- Spouse: Alfred I. du Pont (m. 1921)

Jessie Ball duPont (January 20, 1884 – September 26, 1970) was an American teacher, philanthropist and designated a Great Floridian by the Florida Department of State.

== Biography ==
Jessie Dew Ball was born on January 20, 1884, in Hardings, Virginia to Lalla Gresham and Thomas Ball, a Confederate Civil War veteran and attorney. Aside from a year in Austin, Texas, and a year in Baltimore, Maryland, Ball grew up in Virginia. She earned a Life Certificate from the Farmville (Virginia) Normal School and began teaching in Lancaster County, Virginia, at the age of 18. She taught at the Shiloh School in Northumberland County in 1906-1907. She continued that career after moving in 1909 with her family to San Diego, California. As a young adult, she began amassing profits from the stock market and real estate which she used to fund need-based college scholarships. Eventually vice-principal of the elementary school where she was employed, she contributed to the upkeep of her elderly father and mother until they died in 1917 and 1920, respectively.

=== Marriage ===
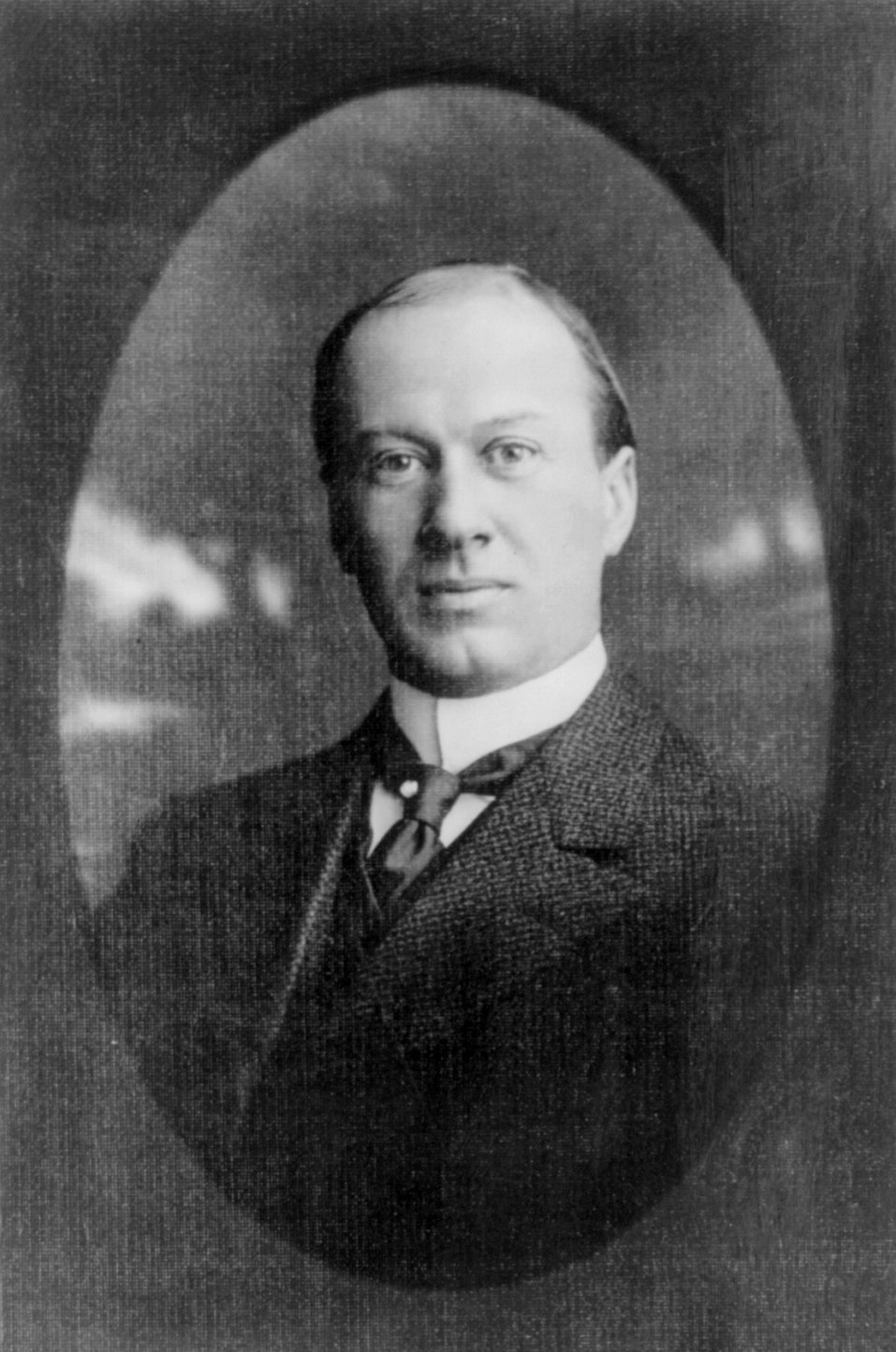
Alfred I. du Pont

Ball met and befriended Alfred I. duPont when she was 14 and he 34, and they maintained a correspondence thereafter. After the 1920 death of his second wife, they entered a courtship which resulted in marriage on January 22, 1921. The couple made their home in the Nemours Mansion and Gardens in Wilmington, Delaware. Retired from teaching, Ball duPont oversaw maintenance of the family estate, took over raising her husband's daughter, Denise, and began to assist duPont in his business.

In 1923, duPont hired Edward Ball, one of Ball duPont's four siblings to survive to adulthood. Ball relocated to Delaware to become manager of the Clean Food Products Company and additionally to advise duPont and manage the estate fortune. The arrival of her brother freed Ball duPont from some of her business concerns so that she could dedicate more time to her charities.

In 1927, the family relocated to Florida, taking up residence in their newly built 58 acres (230,000 m^{2}) estate on the St. John's River, Epping Forest, which was named after the childhood home of Mary Ball Washington, the mother of George Washington, who was Jessie's distant relative. duPont established his main business industry in Jacksonville, with most of his $34 million assets being transferred to his newly formed Almours Securities, Inc. Ball also moved to Florida, and duPont and Ball expanded their business interests in the area, acquiring substantial real estate and buying into Florida National Bank. In 1935, Ball duPont became the director of that bank. Meanwhile, Ball duPont also undertook the preservation of Stratford Hall Plantation, where Confederate General Robert E. Lee had been born. She also renovated and modernized the Lee family residence Ditchley, near Kilmarnock, Virginia. In 1937, she attended the coronation of King George VI. In 1940, she purchased Hurstville and had the house restored as a residence for her sisters.

=== Widowhood ===
On April 29, 1935, Alfred duPont died, leaving Ball duPont as his primary beneficiary. He also established a substantial trust which Ball duPont administered, along with her brother and duPont's son-in-law, Elbert Dent. She served as president of two of the organizations set up by the trust, the Nemours Foundation and the Alfred I. duPont Testamentary Trust. She also sat on the boards at the Alfred I. duPont Institute for Crippled Children at Nemours and the St. Joe Paper Company in Jacksonville, serving as Chairman at the latter.

=== Death ===
She died on September 26, 1970, in Wilmington, Delaware.

== Awards ==
A number of honors were bestowed on Ball duPont during her lifetime. She was the recipient of thirteen honorary degrees and was named a Sister of the Most Venerable Order of the Hospital of St. John of Jerusalem by Queen Elizabeth II in 1963. According to the biography in the Jessie Ball duPont Papers, she was "the first woman to serve on the Board of Control of the State of Florida's higher education system." Since her death, a number of parks and buildings have been named in her honor. In 2000, she was designated a Great Floridian by the Florida Department of State, and in 2001 she was inducted into the Florida Women's Hall of Fame.

== Legacy ==
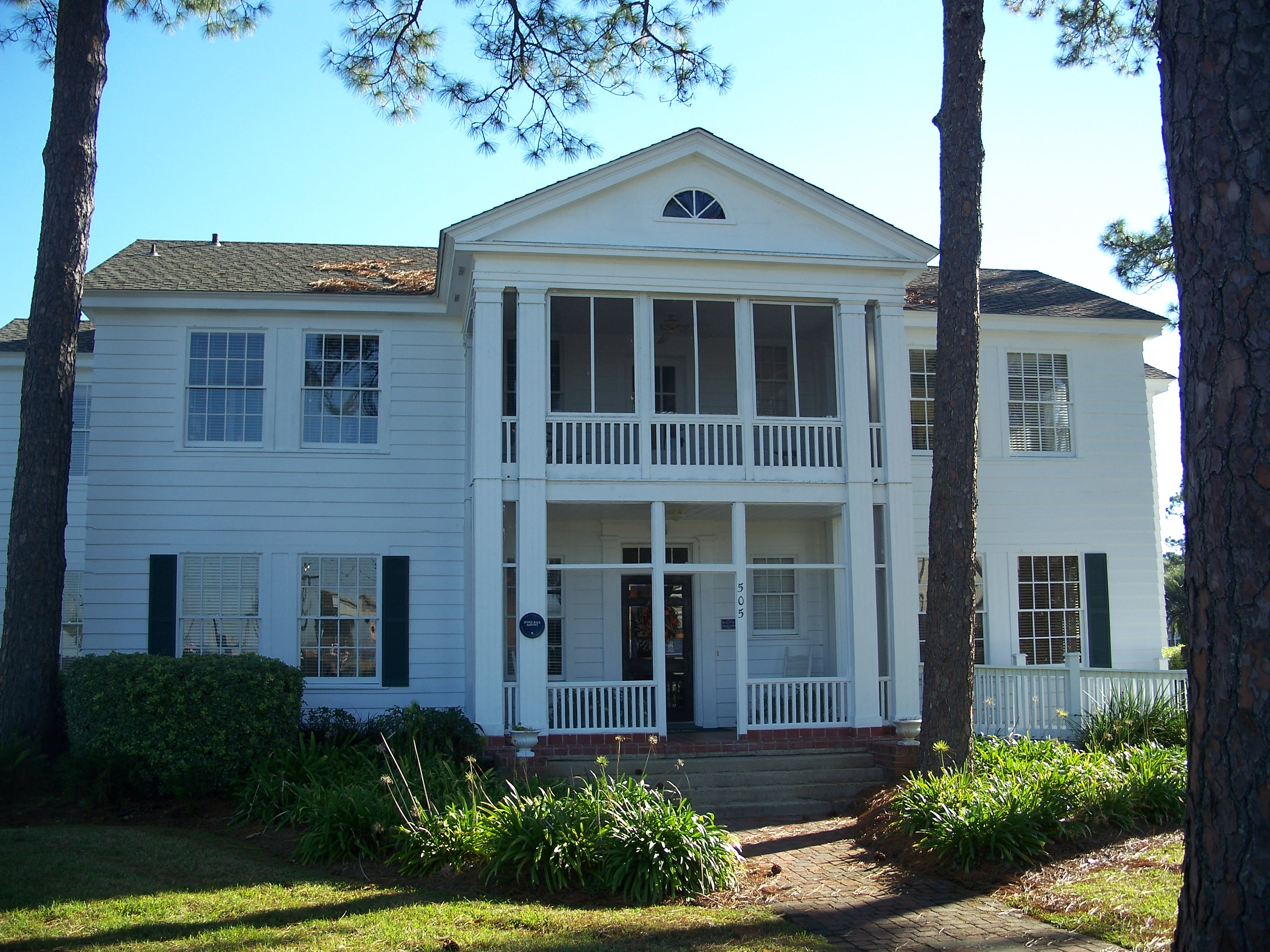
Chateau Nemours, duPont's winter home in Port St. Joe, Florida

Ball duPont remained active in philanthropy for many years before debilitating medical problems restricted her in her 70s. She relocated to Delaware, dying at the Nemours estate on September 26, 1970. Except for personal bequests, the bulk of her assets were placed in the Jessie Ball duPont Fund to continue her philanthropic endeavors. According to the Jessie Ball duPont Fund, her estate at the time was "one of the largest ... in Florida history, estimated at $42 million".

At the College of William & Mary in Virginia, DuPont Hall opened in 1964 and was named after Jessie Ball duPont, benefactress of the College and daughter of Thomas Ball, an alumnus.

Jesse DuPont Hall was constructed in 1951 as part of the Fine Arts Complex at the University of Mary Washington. At the time of its construction, DuPont was the closest living relative to Mary Ball Washington, mother of George Washington.

Ball duPont was also a major donor to Virginia Theological Seminary in Alexandria, Virginia. However on 23 November 1951, she wrote to Dean Stanley Brown-Serman, 'I have been told that one or more negroes are members of the student body... I do not contribute to schools in the south that take negroes as students.' A subsequent letter stated, 'As long as the Virginia Theological Seminary is open to negroes, I have made my last contribution to it...'

== Fund ==
The Jessie Ball duPont Fund is a foundation that issues grants to organizations that received support from Jessie Ball duPont during the years 1960–1964. The official name is the Jessie Ball duPont Religious, Charitable and Educational Fund. According to their website, the Fund focuses on three areas:

- Increasing equitable access to opportunities and resources for members of society who have historically been excluded
- Placemaking to build stronger communities where all voices are heard and valued
- Investing to achieve positive impact in the communities served by the Fund

In 2016, the Jessie Ball duPont Fund provided an initial seed of $250,000 to establish Florida's First Coast Relief Fund, which had raised $545,208 by December 15, 2016. This fund was created in the wake of Hurricane Matthew and gives grants to organizations aiding individuals impacted by hurricanes in five Florida counties. Since its inception, the Relief Fund has distributed $8.98 million through 251 grants to 128 unique organizations in Baker, Clay, Duval, Nassau, Putnam and St. Johns counties. The Relief Fund awarded nearly $5.4 million in grants to 112 local organizations that delivered essential human services to residents disproportionately burdened by the COVID-19 crisis.
