= Henri Crenier =

American sculptor (1873–1948)

Henri Crenier (December 17, 1873–1948) was an American sculptor born in France.

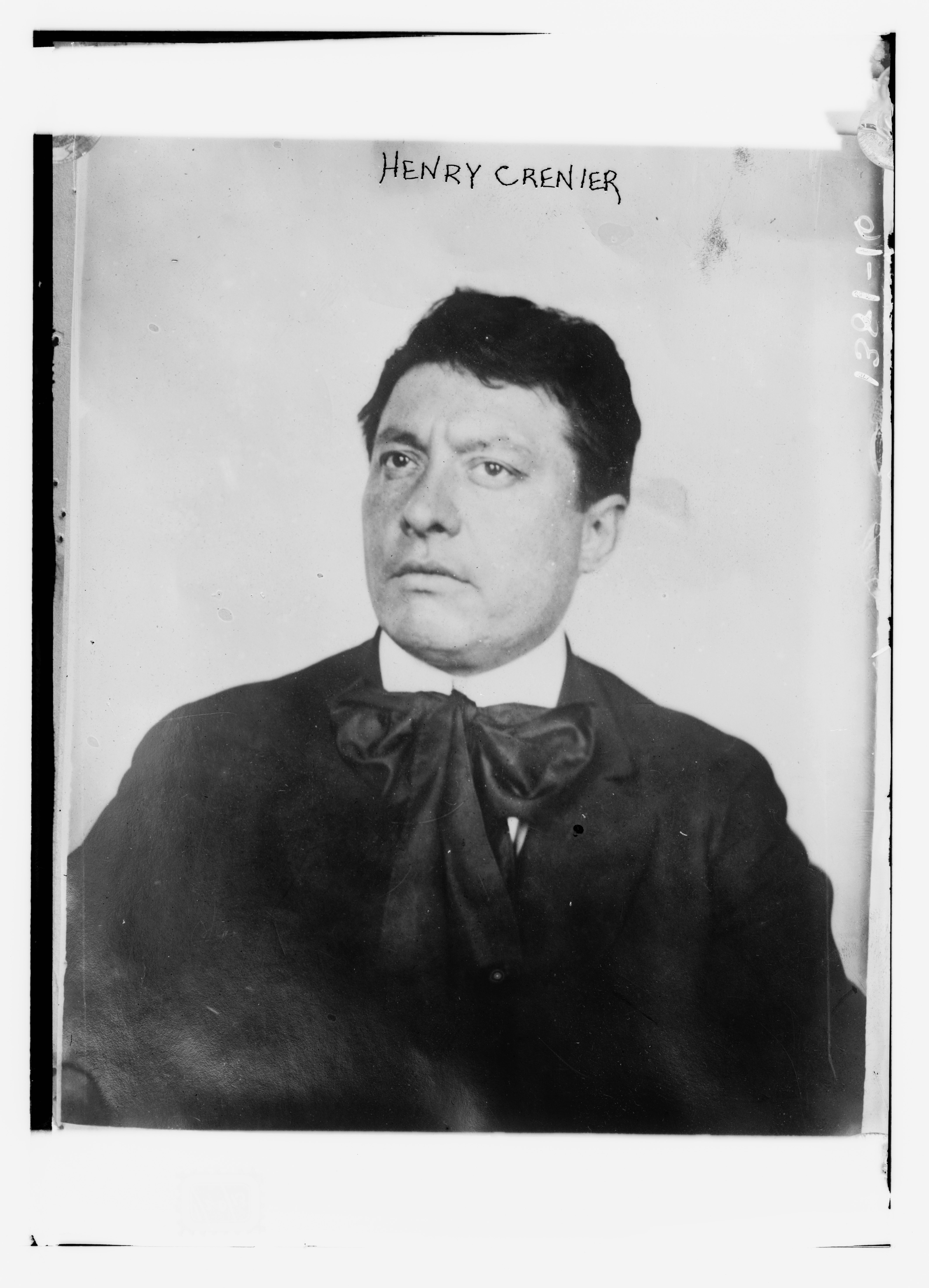
Henri Crenier

Crenier was born in Paris, studied at the École des Beaux-Arts with Alexandre Falguière, worked in Asnières-sur-Seine, and exhibited at the Paris Salon. In 1902 he emigrated to the United States, where he became a citizen in 1911, and became active in New York City, serving as master sculptor in the atelier of Hermon Atkins MacNeil.

His solo work includes the James Fenimore Cooper Memorial in Scarsdale, New York, as well as his single largest commission, the two pediment sculptures in granite for the 1915 San Francisco City Hall. He also contributed to the Panama–Pacific International Exposition (1915) and designed the freestanding figure of Achievement that stands at the Nemours Mansion and Gardens in Wilmington, Delaware.
