= Hurstville (Kilmarnock, Virginia) =

Historic house in Virginia, United States

- U.S. National Register of Historic Places
- Virginia Landmarks Register
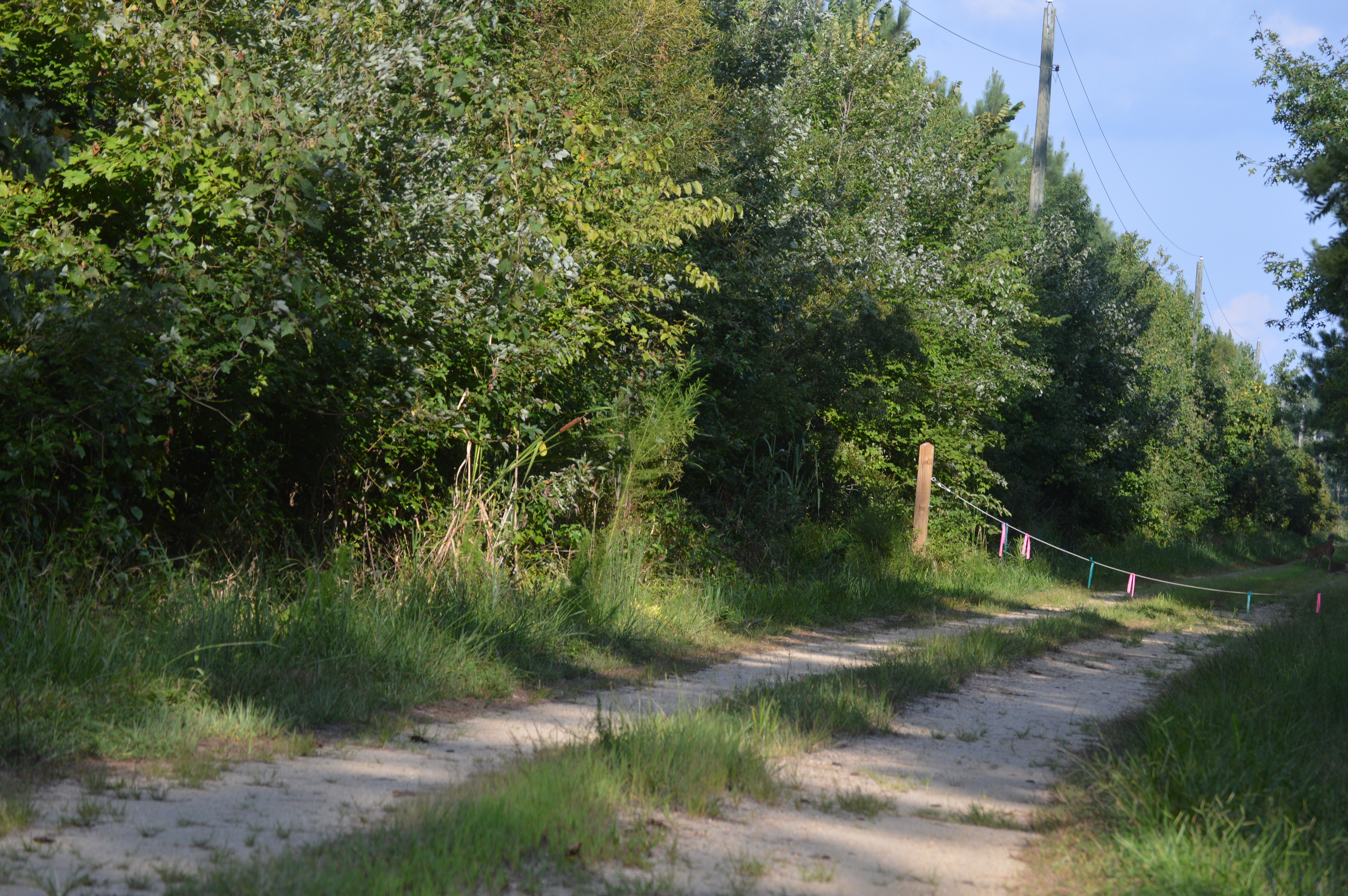
- Entrance to the property

- Location within Virginia Location within the United States
- Location: VA 605 E side, 3500 ft. S of jct. with VA 606, Kilmarnock, Virginia
- Coordinates: 37°45′34″N 76°19′13″W
- Area: 305 acres (123 ha)
- Built: 1777
- Architectural style: Early Republic, Southern Post-Colonial
- NRHP reference No.: 92001264
- VLR No.: 066-0035

Significant dates
- Added to NRHP: September 24, 1992
- Designated VLR: April 22, 1992

Hurstville is a historic plantation house located at Kilmarnock, Northumberland County, Virginia. It was built about 1777, and is a 1 1/2-story, three-bay, double pile brick dwelling with a steep gable roof. It measures 28 feet by 30 feet, and features exterior end chimneys with two sets of tiled weatherings and a beveled water table. Also on the property are the contributing Ball family cemetery and the site of the Cress Field dwelling.

In 1940, Hurstville was purchased by the noted philanthropist, Jessie Ball duPont, who had the house restored as a residence for her sisters. The majority of the markers in the Ball family cemetery are beautifully designed 1920s gray granite markers erected over the graves of members of the Ball family and installed under the direction of Jessie Ball duPont. A portion of the property was originally part of Cress Field, the ancestral Ball family home.

It was listed on the National Register of Historic Places in 1992.
