= Narrow gauge railways of the Nemours sand pits =

Railways in France

Coordinates: 48.2703°N 2.6642°E

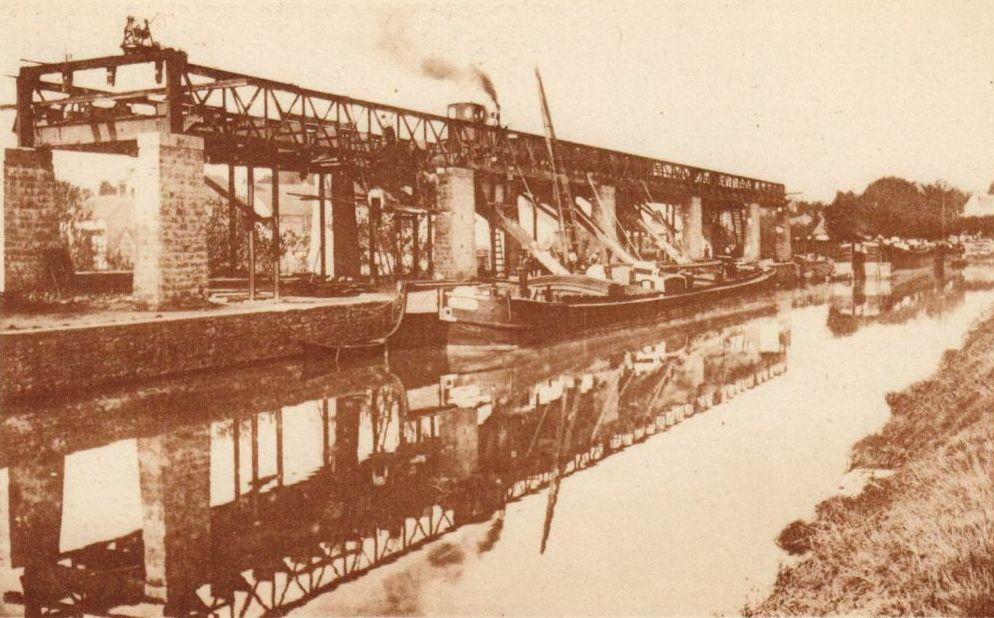
- Light railway on the loading ramp at Canal du Loing in Nemours

Technical
- Line length: Approx. 15 km (9.3 mi)
- Track gauge: 500 mm (19 3/4 in), 600 mm (1 ft 11 5/8 in) and 800 mm (2 ft 7 1/2 in)
Route map
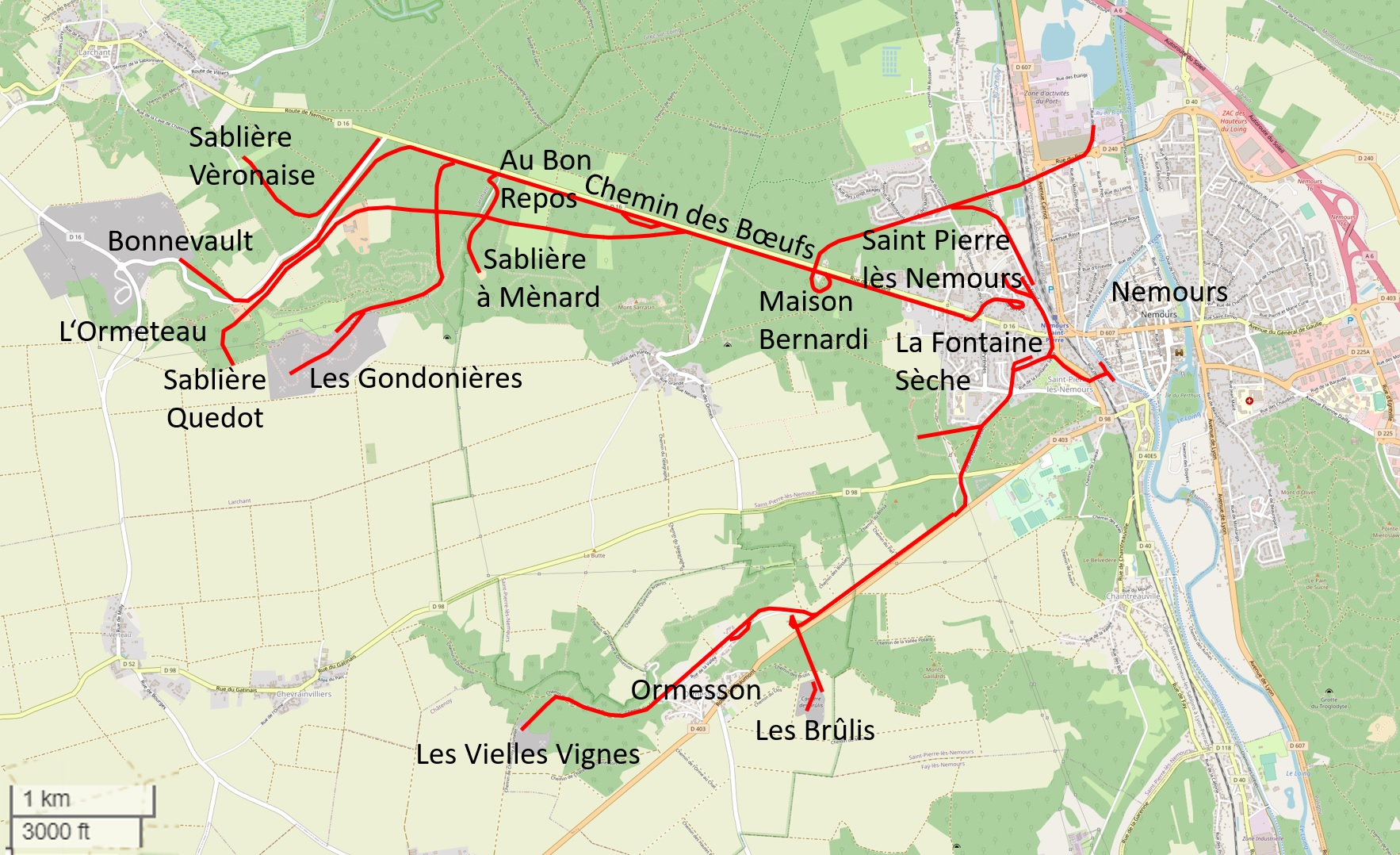
Former route of the narrow gauge railways superimposed onto a modern map

The fourteen narrow gauge railways of the Nemours sand pits (French: Réseau des Sablières de Nemours), with a total length of about 15 kilometres (9.3 mi) and three different gauges of 500 mm (19 3/4 in), 600 mm (1 ft 11 5/8 in) and 800 mm (2 ft 7 1/2 in), ran from several sand pits and underground mines to a depot in Saint-Pierre-lès-Nemours and from there to the Canal du Loing in Nemours.

== History ==
The sand of the Nemours Basin was mined in the 20th century by several family-owned companies for glass production and as molding sand for foundries. Initially, horse-drawn railroads were laid on portable tracks made of prefabricated track sections with metal sleepers. They were later replaced by permanently laid rails on wooden sleepers as more powerful and heavier locomotives were used to increase profitability.

== Route of the light railway lines ==
The light railway line from the Bonnevault and Gondonnieres sand pits to Saint Pierre-les-Nemours was the most important one in the area and probably one of the oldest. The quarry appears to have been established around 1857 and the light railway before 1885. It was demolished around 1966 or 1967.

The Bellefille family light railway line continued south from the Les Brûlis and Les Vieilles Vignes sand pits near Ormesson to Nemours. To get there, the train had to reverse through the streets of Saint-Pierre-les-Nemours, cross the SNCF tracks, pass a small stone viaduct, and finally arrive at a large steel loading ramp on the canal bank. The last section of track was removed around 1950, after which lorries carried the sand between from the depot to the canal. The Bellefille company that operated these sand pits was bought out by the Destalle glass factory on the Meuse, which used a lot of sand. The operation was managed by the sand pit in Nemours until it was discontinued around 1965. The line was operated with six wheel steam locomotives built in 1908, as well as a large three-axle Campagne diesel locomotive and a Plymouth. Later, other smaller Campagne locomotives were used for shunting at the depot. The tipping cars were all wooden, very short, and could only be tipped in one direction (Girafe type).
