= Alfred I. du Pont =

American industrialist (1864–1935)

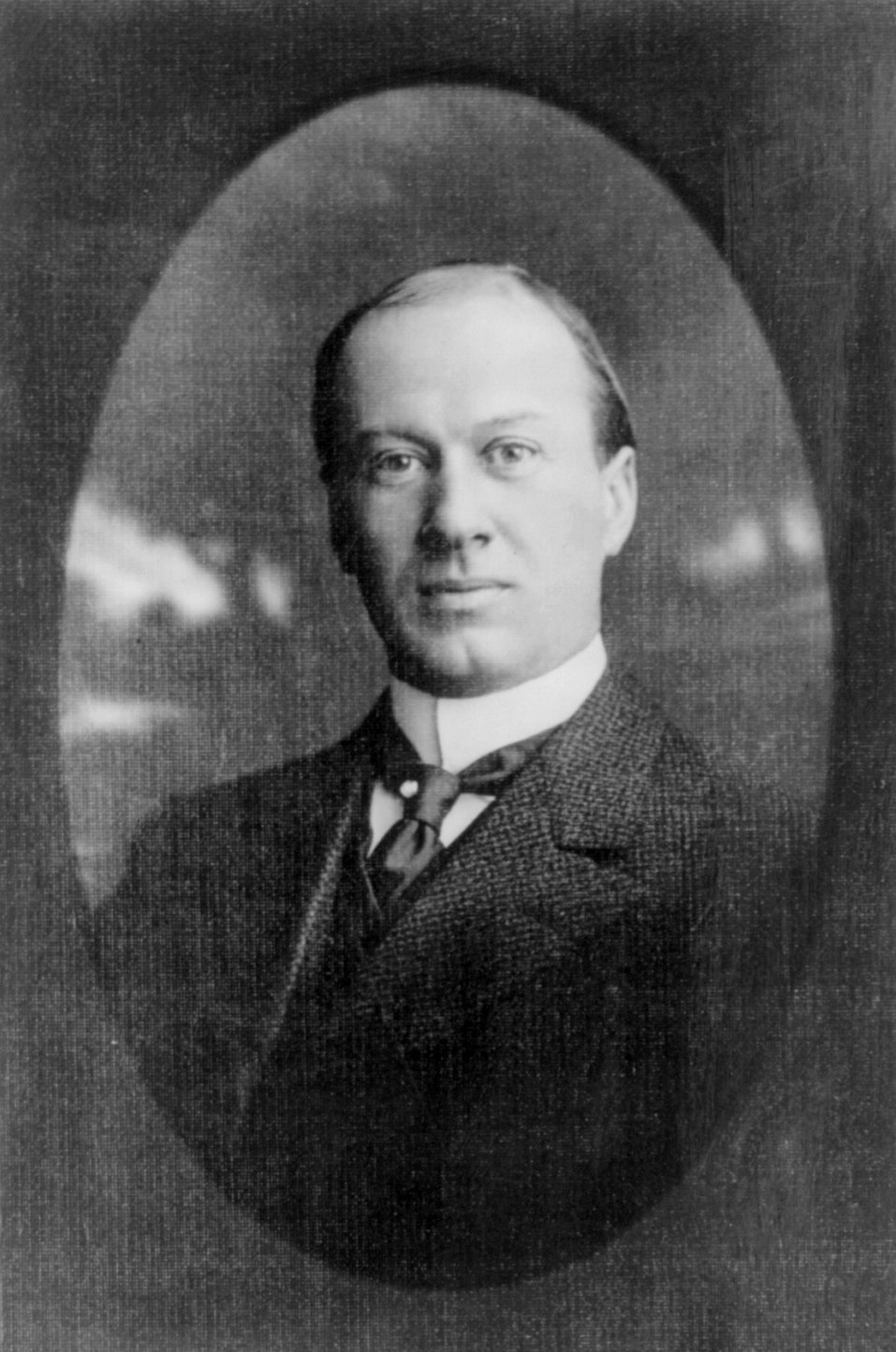
- Born: Alfred Irénée du Pont; May 12, 1864; Brandywine Valley, Delaware, U.S.
- Died: April 28, 1935 (aged 70); Jacksonville, Florida, U.S.
- Education: Phillips Academy, Massachusetts Institute of Technology
- Employer(s): DuPont, Nemours Trading Corporation
- Known for: Industrialist, financier, philanthropist
- Spouse(s): Bessie Gardner (1887–1906; divorce); Mary (Alicia) Heyward Bradford (1907–1920; her death); Jessie Dew Ball (m. 1921)
- Children: 6

Alfred Irénée du Pont (May 12, 1864 – April 28, 1935) was an American industrialist, financier, philanthropist and a member of the influential Du Pont family.

Alfred du Pont first rose to prominence through his work in his family's Delaware-based gunpowder manufacturing plant, E. I. du Pont de Nemours and Company (now known as DuPont), in which for many years he served as a director of the board and Vice President of operations.

Following an acrimonious departure and a brief dip in personal fortunes, he embarked on business of his own, investing in land and banking in Florida. He died a multimillionaire, with the bulk of his fortune sustaining the Alfred I. duPont Testamentary Trust.

== Early years ==
Alfred du Pont was born in the Brandywine Valley region of Delaware, where his great-great-grandfather Pierre Samuel du Pont de Nemours had immigrated with his sons after the French Revolution. His great-grandfather Eleuthère Irénée du Pont had founded E. I. du Pont de Nemours and Company in 1802. His grandfather was Alfred V. du Pont. The son of Éleuthère Irénée du Pont II, a partner in the family's gunpowder business, and Charlotte Shepard Henderson, Alfred I. du Pont had two older sisters and two younger brothers. When du Pont was 13, his mother, who had a history of mental illness, was committed to an asylum following an episode of hysteria. Within a week, she died. The du Pont children were orphaned a month later when Éleuthère followed, a victim of tuberculosis.

Du Pont's family intended to separate the children and sell their family home, Swamp Hall, but were persuaded otherwise by the fierce resistance of the children. The girls remained in the home, but du Pont was sent to boarding school: first, to the religious Shinn Academy in New Jersey and then, two years later, Phillips Academy at Andover, Massachusetts. After graduation, he enrolled in the Massachusetts Institute of Technology, sharing a room with his cousin T. Coleman du Pont.

== Family business ==
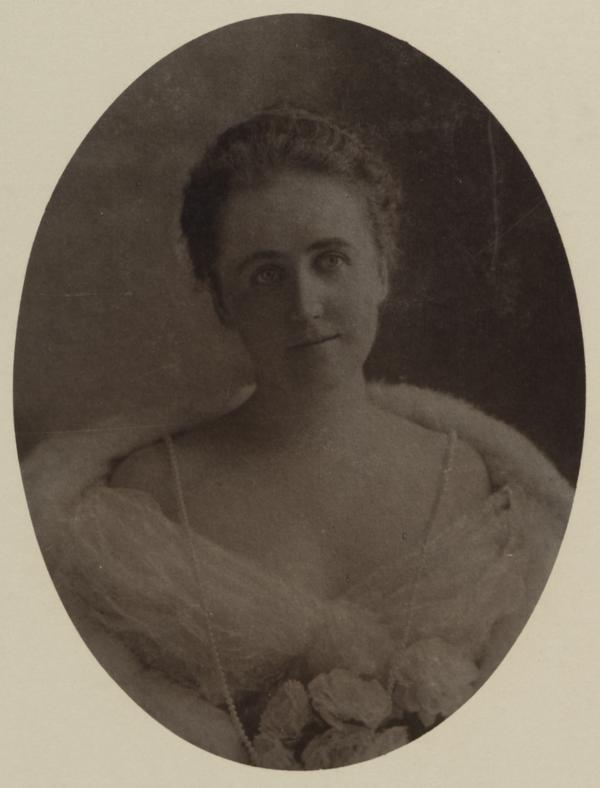
Bessie Gardner du Pont

In 1884, after only two years at MIT, he left to work at the family's gunpowder manufacturing plant in the Brandywine mills. Though he started in a low position, he eventually became known, according to the Alfred I. du Pont Foundation, as "one of the nation's top powder men." Most of the over 200 patents he registered were related to this work.

Du Pont married his cousin Bessie Gardner (1864–1949) in 1887, and she was the mother of his first four children. In 1889, the manufacturing plant passed to the management of Eugène du Pont, at which time it was reorganized and renamed DuPont, and du Pont was made a limited partner. Beyond that, Eugène du Pont and other family members largely ignored du Pont, excluding him from the company board.

In 1902, upon the death of Eugène du Pont, the three senior partners considered selling the company to competitor Laflin & Rand Powder Company. Du Pont proposed keeping the company in the family, and the senior partners agreed on condition that du Pont be joined in the venture by T. Coleman du Pont, who would be president, and Pierre S. du Pont. They had no money, but the cousins were able to convince other family members to exchange their company shares for a promissory note instead of cash, plus shares in the reorganized company. According to the Trust organization, the company was purchased "for $15.4 million—$12 million in notes and 33,000 shares of the reorganized DuPont", with the partners retaining $8.6 million worth of shares (86,400). The actual amount of money which the partners were required to pay was $2,100, at $700 each for lawyers' fees.

Pierre du Pont was named Treasurer and Executive Vice President of the company, while Alfred du Pont served as vice president for operations and took over the black powder manufacture and sat on the executive committee. Alfred was directly engaged with the company and instituted major changes to its operation that resulted in greater efficiency and safety, leading to a boom in business.

== Divorce and remarriage ==
During this period, du Pont was involved in a hunting accident that ultimately resulted in the loss of one of his eyes. The same year, in 1906, he divorced his first wife, Bessie. The couple's marriage had never been a happy one, and although du Pont supported his family financially, with $24,000 a year in support, he cut off contact with all but his eldest child, Madeleine du Pont. With a week's eviction notice, he removed them from the family home at Swamp Hall and had it destroyed. This, coupled with du Pont's remarriage to a divorced second cousin in 1907, seriously strained relations between du Pont and other members of his family.

Du Pont's relationship with his second wife, Mary (Alicia) Heyward Bradford (1875–1920), had already been the subject of family scandal, as family members had remarked on the close relationship of the two even before Alicia Bradford's marriage to du Pont's secretary, George Amory Maddox. Maddox and his wife lived close to du Pont and were frequently visited by him; du Pont and Bradford, who had borne a daughter in the meantime, left their spouses at around the same time and were married two weeks after Bradford's divorce was final. Du Pont's adoption of Bradford's daughter, Alicia Maddox, brought fresh gossip to the family, who largely rallied in support of his first wife, which in turn inspired du Pont to file several lawsuits against family members and friends for slander, all of which were dropped in due time.

Du Pont gave Bradford a new home built on 300 acres (1.2 km^{2}) in Wilmington, Delaware. Construction of the Nemours Mansion and Gardens occurred between 1909 and 1910. The mansion is a five-story, 77-room, 47,000 sq ft (4,400 m^{2}) structure that was designed by renowned architects Carrère and Hastings, who also designed the New York Public Library, New York City's Frick Mansion, and Whitehall, the Henry Flagler Museum in Palm Beach, Florida. The building looks like a French château and the architectural style is Louis XVI. The estate was named after the French town affiliated with his ancestor, Pierre Samuel du Pont de Nemours.

Within the short time of the marriage, Bradford bore four children for du Pont, none of whom survived long.

== Lawsuit and departure from E.I. du Pont de Nemours ==
Through the early 1910s, Alfred du Pont was engaged in fierce debate over the future of the family's business with Coleman and Pierre du Pont, whose support for du Pont's first wife had extended to building her and her children a home after their eviction from Swamp Hall. The struggle became bitter after Coleman du Pont decided to leave the company for health concerns in 1914.

As he was departing, ill and in need of money for another business transaction, Coleman du Pont decided to sell 20,000 shares in the company to key company employees, but when Alfred du Pont and Pierre du Pont disagreed on the proper pricing and handling of the transaction, wound up selling considerably more shares (over 77,000 shares combined of common and preferred stock) to Pierre du Pont and five associates, who had formed the DuPont Securities Company. This secret and swift transaction gave Pierre du Pont, 60 percent ownership of DuPont Securities and, thereby, considerable control over the family business. While the value of the shares greatly increased due to the success of the company during World War I, Alfred du Pont and other minority shareholders launched a lawsuit against Pierre du Pont, alleging that he had acted as an agent of the E.I. du Pont de Nemours company, who should be rightful holders of the shares.

The suit was extremely well publicized and acrimonious. In 1916, shortly after company shareholders voted to remove Alfred du Pont from its board of directors, the United States District Court found that Pierre du Pont had operated in bad faith, ordering a stockholder vote to determine if the stockholders (aside from those who owned the disputed shares) wished to purchase the disputed shares. By a share ratio of 33:13, shareholders did not, and, accordingly, in 1918, the court dismissed the action. Alfred du Pont brought an appeal which ended unsuccessfully in March 1919.

No longer involved in running E.I. du Pont de Nemours, du Pont instead began to invest in newspapers, as a publisher of which he successfully opposed T. Coleman du Pont's bid for the presidency and Henry A. du Pont's third run for the Senate. According to the du Pont Trust, he also "established an investment firm, Nemours Trading Corporation, and an import-export business in New York" and acquired a majority interest in the Delaware Trust Company.

== Widowed and third marriage ==
Jessie du Pont

A bad business transaction had left him nearly bankrupt when, in January 1920, his second wife died. Missing an eye since his earlier accident, he was now also nearly deaf. But his life was about to change with his third marriage.

Du Pont had been corresponding with Jessie Ball, 20 years his junior, since the time of their meeting in 1898 when she was 14. By 1920, Ball was an assistant principal at an elementary school in San Diego, California, and du Pont began courting her, at the same time divesting himself of assets and cutting back on spending. He wed Ball on January 22, 1921, and the couple returned to the East Coast to settle into Nemours. The couple had no children of their own, but Ball du Pont accepted young Denise, a child du Pont had fostered with his second wife, as her own. She also helped mend rifts between du Pont and the estranged children of his first marriage.

Ball du Pont proved to be a great assistance to him as well in his work, as did her younger brother. Edward Ball and du Pont hit it off and Edward Ball began working for his brother-in-law in 1923, moving to Delaware where he was publicly named manager of the Clean Food Products Company. There, he became a caretaker of the du Pont de Nemours estate fortune.

== Relocation and later life ==
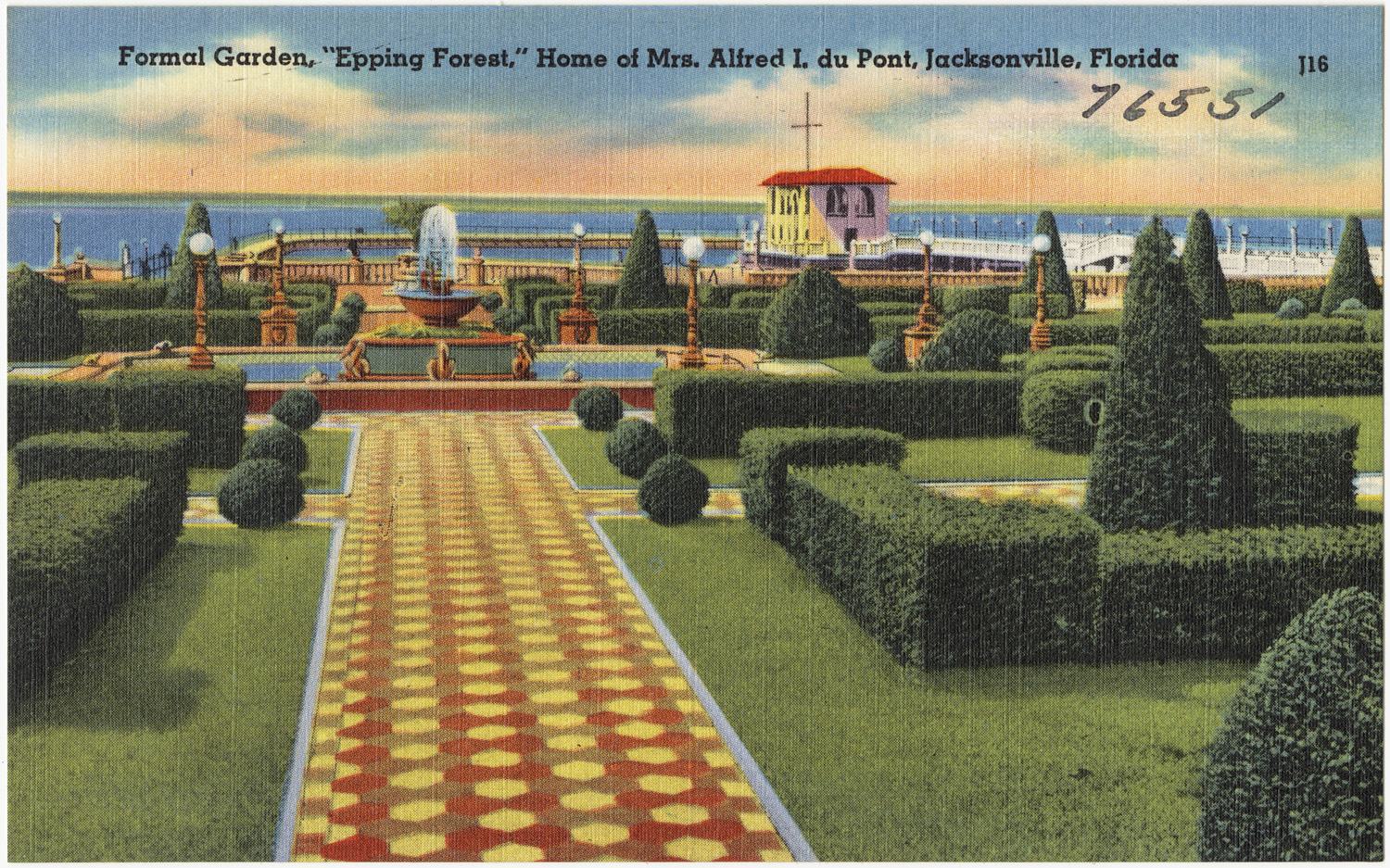
du Pont home "Epping Forest" in Jacksonville, ca. 1930–1945

Du Pont and his third wife had already made several trips to Florida on their motor yacht, Nenemoosha, when Pierre du Pont was named Tax Commissioner of Delaware in 1925. Harboring hard feelings against his cousin, Alfred du Pont and Jessie Ball du Pont moved to Jacksonville, Florida in 1926, where they established permanent residency. There, du Pont purchased 58 acres (230,000 m^{2}) of land on the St. Johns River and built a 25-room mansion and landscaped grounds, as well as a berth for the couple's motor yacht. Ball du Pont named the estate Epping Forest, after the Virginia plantation of Mary Ball Washington, George Washington's mother and Ball du Pont's relative. Edward Ball, too, relocated to Florida, to continue working with du Pont.

In Florida, du Pont made primarily small real estate investments at first, correctly fearing a drop in real estate values, before turning his attention to acquiring interest in banks. He acquired an interest in Florida National Bank (FNB) of Jacksonville, keeping it solvent during a bank run of 1929 by putting $15 million of his own money into an account. During the early 1930s, six other Florida National Banks were opened throughout Florida, including Lakeland and Bartow.

During this time, du Pont was expanding his philanthropic activities. He personally funded a pension plan program for seniors in Delaware in 1929 and turned his attention to revitalizing Florida after the devastation of a 1926 hurricane and the Great Depression.

== Other activities ==
Besides his interest in business, du Pont was an accomplished and passionate violinist and composer. Using friends and his factory workers from DuPont, he formed an orchestra that was named the Tankopanicum Musical Club. According to the du Pont Trust, du Pont "published nine pieces of music [during his lifetime], eight marches and one gavotte, a French peasant dance, which was performed at the Grand Opera House in Wilmington in 1907." John Philip Sousa, who was a friend, performed one of his marches.

== Death and legacy ==
When du Pont died in 1935 in Jacksonville, Florida at age 70, his estate was valued at over $56 million, which, after estate taxes of $30 million, left $26 million.

The vast majority of his fortune was left in testamentary trust with Jessie named as the principal trustee with complete discretion regarding use of any money, but in reality, she deferred business decisions to her brother, who took control of the assets, which included the large Florida landholdings of the St. Joe Company and industrial interests, including the Florida East Coast Railway. Jessie preferred to handle the philanthropic activities of the trust while Edward concentrated on making money.

The fortune did not become a charitable trust until Jessie's death in 1970, which explains why $30 million in estate taxes were paid in 1935. The Alfred I. duPont Testamentary Trust's sole charitable beneficiary is the Nemours Foundation, which runs children's medical facilities in Delaware and Florida.

Beginning in the 1970s, Delaware Attorney General sued du Pont's brother-in-law Edward Ball and other trustees of the Nemours Foundation for failing to implement du Pont's mission for his Trust and for diverting its assets away from charitable needs in Delaware to fund Trust operations in Florida. This legal action led to a 1980 settlement agreement, stipulating that no more than 50% of the trust's annual distributions could be spent outside Delaware. The agreement aimed to ensure that Delaware residents received the primary benefits of duPont's philanthropy, as outlined in his will.

The case has continued into the 21st century. In 2017, Delaware Attorney General filed another lawsuit, asserting that the Nemours Foundation and the trust had breached the 1980 agreement by allocating more than the permitted 50% of funds to out-of-state operations. The lawsuit highlighted significant investments in facilities outside Delaware, including a $400 million hospital in Orlando, Florida, which was reportedly operating at a loss. Meanwhile, Delaware facilities faced budget cuts, prompting questions about the equitable distribution of resources.

In February 2025, the Supreme Court of Florida declined to hear a dispute. The decision let stand a 2024 ruling by the Florida 5th District Court of Appeal. That appellate decision affirmed that Delaware Attorney General Kathy Jennings has standing to sue over alleged violations of a 1980 agreement.

The trust was valued at $72.5 million in 1939; $2 billion in 1981; $4.5 billion in 2006.

Unlike most of his family members, du Pont was not buried at the family's Du Pont de Nemours Cemetery. He is interred, along with his wife and brother-in-law, in a large mausoleum on the grounds of the Alfred I. duPont Hospital for Children, one of the first projects created with his trust.

Both Nemours and Epping Forest have been restored to their original splendor. A public school in Jacksonville, the Alfred I. duPont Middle School, is located not far from his Epping Forest estate.

Alfred du Pont was designated a Great Floridian by the Florida Department of State in the Great Floridians 2000 Program. A plaque attesting to the honor is located at the entry gate to the Epping Forest estate in Jacksonville.

An elementary school along the Concord Pike north of Wilmington, the Alfred I. duPont School was named in his honor, and opened in 1937, shortly after his death. This later grew to be the Alfred I. duPont School District (Alfred I. duPont Special School District after 1968), and helped open a number of schools now in the Brandywine School District, including Brandywine High School and Concord High School. This district was dissolved in 1978 due to federal order.

The World War II Liberty Ship SS Alfred I. Dupont was named in his honor.
