= Nemours Foundation =

Private foundation based in Jacksonville, Florida, US

- Formation: 1936
- Type: Charitable foundation
- Headquarters: 10140 Centurion Parkway North, Jacksonville, Florida, US
- President & CEO: R. Lawrence Moss
- Key people: Sean D. Baptiste; Aaron Carpenter; Matthew Davis; James "Jim" Digan; Laura Kowal; Martha McGill; Mark Mumford; Jane Mericle; Caswell L. Samms, III; Kara Odom Walker
- Website: www.nemours.org

The Nemours Foundation is a non-profit organization in Jacksonville, Florida. It was created through the last will and testament of philanthropist Alfred I. du Pont by his widow Jessie Ball duPont in 1936, and is dedicated to improving the health of children. The Foundation manages endowments, philanthropy and governance relating to pediatric healthcare.

The foundation is the primary beneficiary of the Alfred I. duPont Testamentary Trust, which had a value over $5 billion in 2015. Alfred duPont's will stipulated that the trust make an annual disbursement of an amount equal to 3% of the trust's value.

== History ==
The Nemours Foundation was created by the will of Alfred I. duPont and primarily functions as a philanthropic entity funding healthcare initiatives. Born into wealth, duPont left most of his fortune to charity. The estate's principal was valued at $40 million at the time of duPont's death.

A year after his death in 1935, duPont's widow Jessie Ball duPont and her trustees chartered The Nemours Foundation in Jacksonville, Florida. Jessie immediately began recruiting a Medical Advisory Board of leading physicians and surgeons for the foundation, including selecting Alfred R. Shands Jr., an orthopedic surgeon, as the first medical director in 1937.

In 1938, the Nemours Foundation began awarding research fellowships. Between 1938 and 1940, Nemours awarded 24 fellowships to researchers in academic hospitals.

== Nemours Children's Health ==
The Nemours Foundation oversees and funds Nemours Children's Health, among the United States' largest multi-state, multi-hospital health systems dedicated solely to the health and well-being of children. The Nemours Children's model of health includes pediatric clinical care, research, medical education, policy, prevention, and population health.

The clinical practice consists of two free-standing children's hospitals, Nemours Children's Hospital, Delaware in Wilmington, Delaware and Nemours Children's Hospital, Florida in Orlando's Medical City Lake Nona, more than 70 Nemours Children's specialty, urgent and primary care practices in Delaware, Florida, Pennsylvania and New Jersey, and direct-to-consumer pediatric urgent care via its Nemours App telehealth. Its children's health media arm features KidsHealth.org, which provides doctor-approved information about the health, behavior, and development of children from birth to adulthood, KidsHealth in the Classroom health curriculum for elementary, middle and high school educators, and KidsHealth patient instructions and KidsHealth GetWell Network licensed by providers across the U.S.

In 1997, Nemours established a relationship with the University of Florida Medical Center and collaborated with the Mayo Foundation to develop research and residency programs.

Nemours Children's Health refined its strategy in 2025 to emphasize population health by addressing social and environmental factors that influence children's well-being in addition to providing clinical care.

In April 2025, Nemours became the official Children's Health Partner of the Philadelphia Union, Subaru Park, and WSFS Bank Sportsplex.

In May 2025, Nemours announced a partnership with the Studer Family Children's Hospital at Ascension Sacred Heart Pensacola. The agreement will centralize subspecialty services in the region under Nemours Children's Health.

In June 2025, Baptist Health announced it will terminate its longstanding clinical partnership with UF Health in early 2026 and transition the services to Nemours Children's Health, although Baptist's Wolfson Children's Hospital will continue to serve as the primary pediatric training site for the University of Florida College of Medicine-Jacksonville.

== Nemours Mansion and Gardens ==
The Nemours Mansion and Gardens in Wilmington, Delaware, is also owned and operated by the Nemours Foundation.

Construction of the 77-room mansion was completed in 1910. It was restored in the mid-2000s and is open seasonally for public tours.
