= Nemours Children's Hospital, Florida =

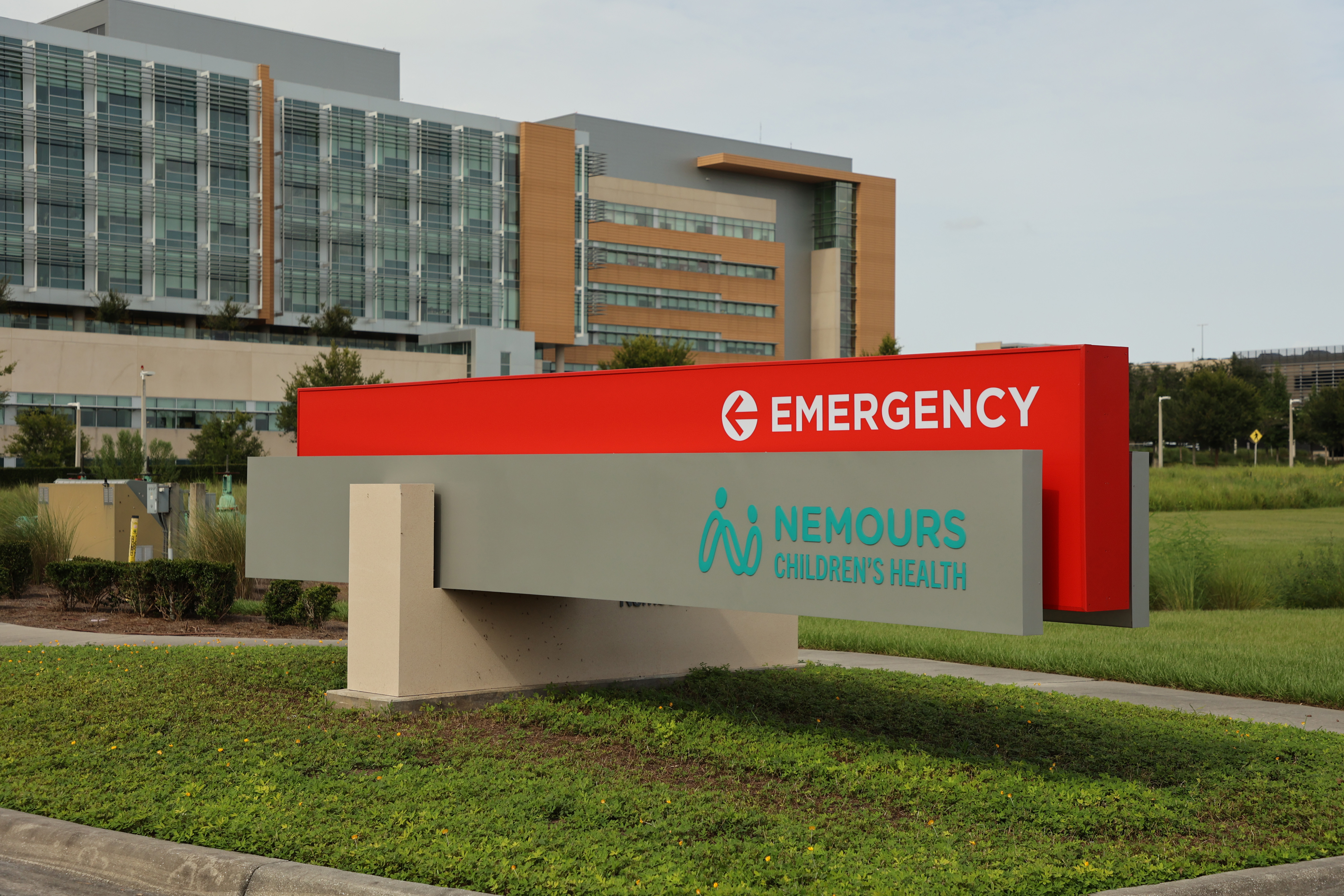
- Nemours Children's Hospital, Florida

Geography
- Location: 6535 Nemours Pkwy, Orlando, Florida, United States
- Coordinates: 28.376702°N 81.273605°W

Organization
- Affiliated university: University of Central Florida College of Medicine

Services
- Emergency department: Yes
- Beds: 130

Helipads
- Helipad: Yes

History
- Construction started: 2009
- Opened: 2012

Links
- Website: www.nemours.org/locations/orlando-nemours-childrens-hospital.html
- Lists: Hospitals in Florida

Nemours Children's Hospital, Florida (NCHFL) is a freestanding, 130-bed, pediatric acute care children's hospital located in Lake Nona Medical City in Orlando, Florida. It is affiliated with the University of Central Florida College of Medicine and is a member of the Nemours Children's Health, one of two freestanding hospitals in the system. The hospital, a multi-year recipient of The Leapfrog Award for quality and safety, provides comprehensive pediatric specialties and subspecialties to infants, children, teens, and young adults aged 0–21 throughout Central Florida and beyond. It features a regional pediatric intensive-care unit, neonatal intensive care units, and cardiac intensive care unit, serving both central Florida and the greater Florida regions.

The hospital also has a helipad and transport vehicles to transport critically ill patients to and from the hospital. In addition, Nemours Children’s Hospital, Florida features its own Nemours Children’s Hospital Residency Program (established in 2017) and, in partnership with the University of Central Florida’s College of Education started PedsAcademy, the first hospital-based inpatient education and teacher training program.

== History ==
When Nemours announced their plans to open a new children's hospital in Orlando, the public did not support the plan. Adversaries of the project were concerned with the fact that two children's hospitals already existed in the Orlando region and another one would duplicate services and drive prices up. Nemours filed multiple attempts to get their hospital approved and even discussed buying Arnold Palmer Hospital for Children but state officials did not see the need for another children's hospital. Nemours then started an aggressive advertising campaign talking about wanting to bring a nationally recognized children's hospital to the Orlando region. After many attempts to get their project greenlighted by state officials, Nemours was approved.

Construction of the hospital began on February 25, 2009, and was managed by the architectural firm Skanska and designed by a collaboration of Stanley Beaman, Sears Atlanta Perkins, Will Boston.

The new children's hospital is a part of the Nemours Foundation dba as Nemours Children's Health and cost $397 million. The hospital is 630,000 square feet and has a maximum bed capacity of 137 beds, with only 95 operating.

In 2016, a new Ronald McDonald House with 15 bedrooms opened adjacent to NCHFL.

In 2017, hospital administration announced that they would expand into their 6th floor, adding 30 patient beds. In addition to 30 inpatient beds, the expansion added an operating room and cardiac catheterization lab. The expansion was completed in early 2020.

In April 2018, Nemours raised $7 million in its first fundraising campaign. The funds were raised to support the renovation of the Nemours building at 807 Children's Way in San Marco, with additional support allocated to Nemours’ Center for Cancer & Blood Disorders and its Hearing Loss Program.

On May 12, 2021, the hospital announced that its name will be changed to "Nemours Children’s Hospital, Florida", in the summer of 2021.

In June 2023, Nemours opened The Players Center for Cancer and Blood Disorders, a new facility that provides a full spectrum of cancer and blood disorder care delivery.

In September 2023, NCHFL became an official treatment site for gene therapy to treat a rare muscular disease. Dr. Omar Abdul Hamid, a pediatric neurologist at NCHFL, treated the first patient in Florida with Duchenne Muscular Dystrophy (DMD).

In April 2024, Nemours partnered with the University of Central Florida to train future pediatric doctors. The partnership will address a projected shortage of physicians across Florida by 2035.

In December 2024, the hospital announced plans for a $300 million expansion over the next four years. The plan consists of three new buildings on the hospital campus.

== Services ==
The hospital offers inpatient, outpatient, and rehabilitation services as well as a children's clinic and emergency department on the 60-acre campus.

Notable features of the new hospital include all private rooms, expanded storage spaces, and technologies to secure patient rooms and entertain patients.

== Awards ==
In 2013, the hospital attained a LEED Gold certification due to its advanced environmental design. The hospital was the first in Florida to obtain the status, and the third children's hospital in the U.S. to be LEED Gold certified.

In 2013, the hospital was listed as one of the "Most Wired" hospitals in the U.S. by the Hospitals and Health Networks magazine.

In 2015, the hospital was ranked on the list of "The 50 Most Amazing Children’s Hospitals in the World" by Healthcare Administration DP.

In 2019, the hospital was one of three children's hospitals in Florida to earn "Top Children's Hospital" status from The Leapfrog Group, and has earned the recognition for multiple years.

In 2024, the hospital earned U.S. News and World Report rankings in Diabetes & Endocrinology and Orthopedics.

Also that year, the Emergency Department received the 2024–2027 Lantern Award from the Emergency Nurses Association for the third time.

== See also ==
- List of children's hospitals in the United States
- Nemours Foundation
- Nemours Alfred I. duPont Hospital for Children
- Wolfson Children's Hospital
