= Nemours Estate =

Estate in Wilmington, Delaware

Coordinates: 39.7766°N 75.5580°W

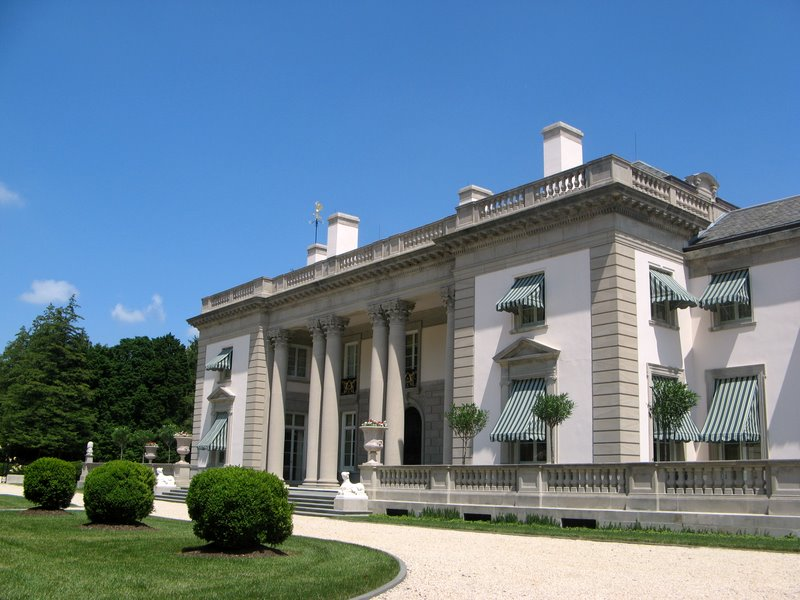
- Nemours Estate from the front
- Interactive map of Nemours Estate
- Motto: Yours to Love and to Know
- Owner: Nemours Foundation
- Website: www.nemoursestate.org

The Nemours Estate is a 200-acre (81 ha) country estate with jardin à la française formal gardens and a French neoclassical mansion in Wilmington, Delaware, United States. Built to resemble a French château, its 105 rooms on four floors occupy nearly 47,000 sq ft (4,400 m^{2}). It shares the grounds at 1600 Rockland Road with the Nemours Children's Hospital, Delaware, and both are owned by the Nemours Foundation.

== Origin ==
Nemours was created by Alfred I. du Pont in 1909–10 as a gift for his second wife, Alicia. It was named for the north-central French town of Nemours, which was affiliated with his great-great-grandfather, Pierre Samuel du Pont de Nemours. Carrère and Hastings designed the mansion, which is in the Louis XVI style of French architecture.

== Furnishings ==
The house contains rare 18th-century French furniture and an eclectic collection of notable antiques, works of art and tapestries. Artworks range from 16th-century religious works to paintings by the European masters to early works by Americans Frederic Remington and Sidney Lawrence.

Of particular interest is a rare Louis XVI musical clock, circa 1785, by David Roentgen and Peter Kinzing, which plays four tunes on a dulcimer and pipe organ. Another clock at the mansion with a connection to French royalty is one made for Marie Antoinette, which she never received.

The mansion also has a chair from the 1937 coronation of King George VI, an event which was attended by Alfred I. du Pont's third wife Jessie, and a chair from Independence Hall. Alfred I. du Pont's own portrait is also in the mansion.

== Landscape gardens ==
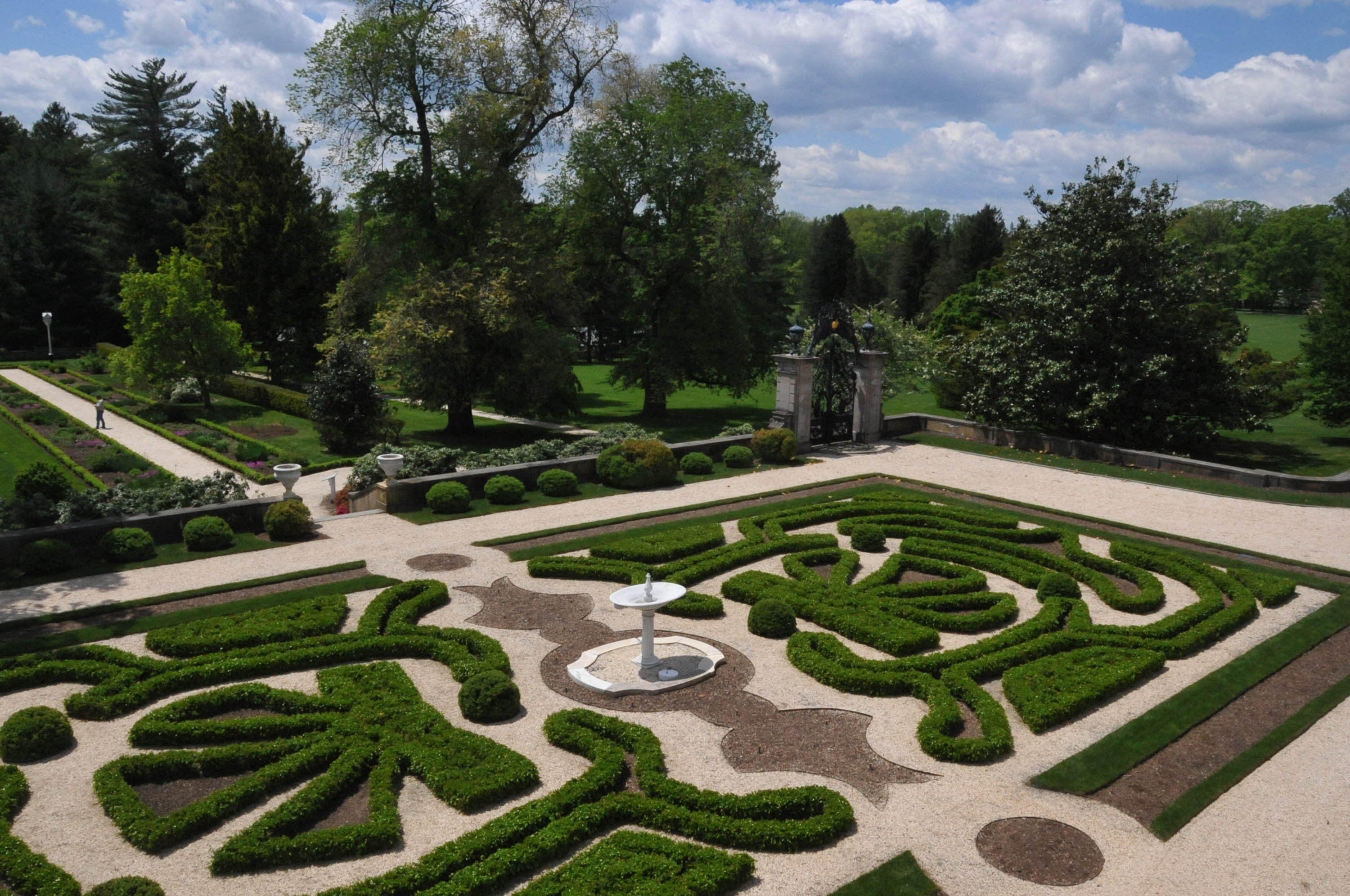
Boxwood Garden

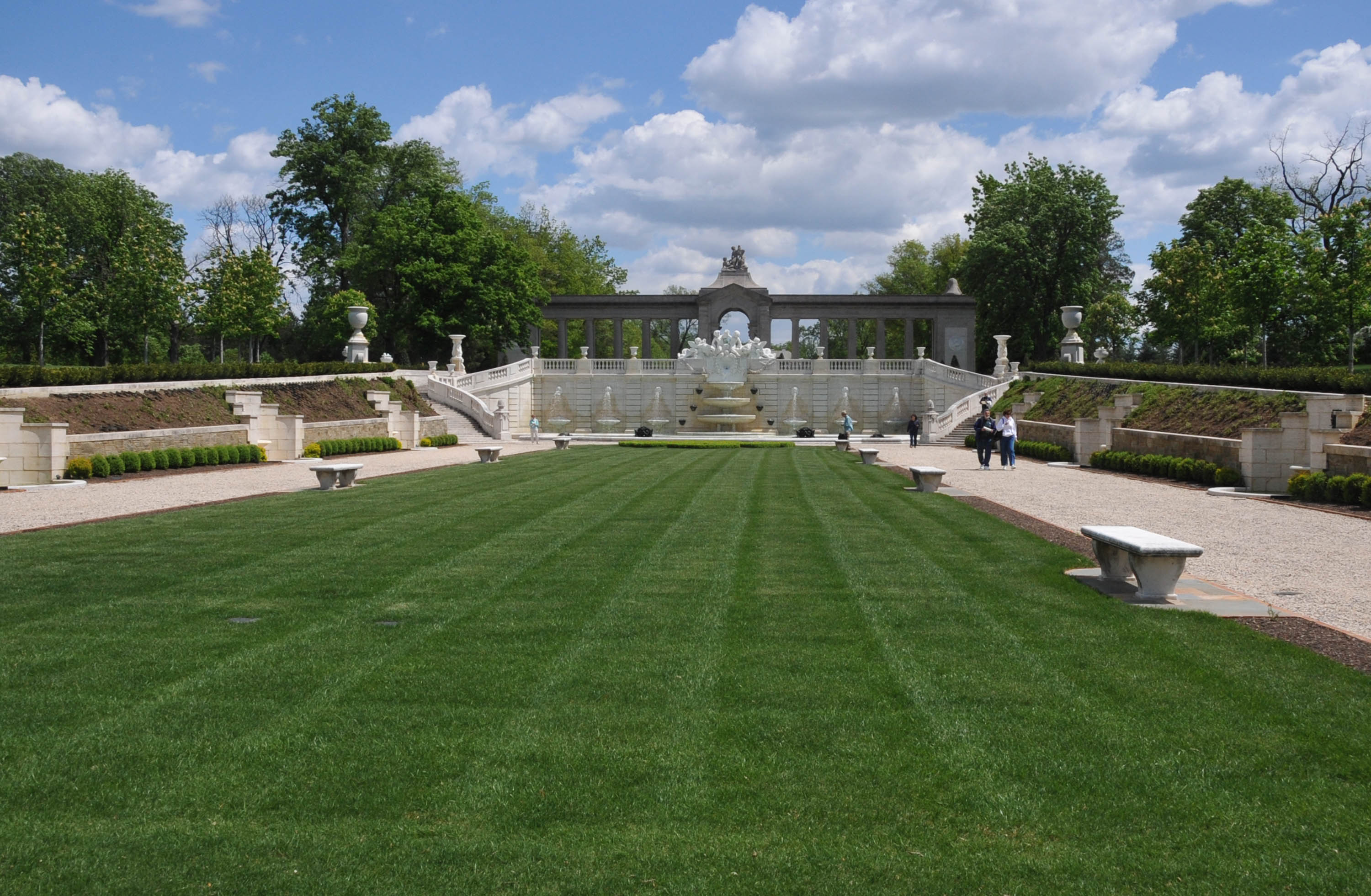
Sunken Garden

The estate has the most developed and largest jardin à la française (French formal garden)-style landscape park and collection of individual gardens in North America. The design is patterned after the gardens of Versailles surrounding the Petit Trianon at the Château de Versailles. Their central axis extends ⅓ of a mile from the mansion facade, paralleling the main avenue leading to the house. The grounds are beautifully landscaped with plantings, fountains, pools, a carillon tower, statuary, and a pavilion surrounded by naturalized woodlands.

The named features include:

- The Boxwood Garden – French parterre garden with boxwood edging and a central faun fountain.
- The Colonnade (1926) – memorial to Pierre Samuel du Pont de Nemours and his son Eleuthère Irénée du Pont, designed by Thomas Hastings.
- The Maze Garden – a maze garden with main hedges of Western Arborvitae 'Spring Grove', inner hedges of Japanese Barberry 'Crimson Pygmy', and central statue of Achievement, by Henri Crenier, atop a base with images of Triton and Neptune's face.
- The Reflecting Pool (1 acre) – 40 feet (12 m) in diameter, with 157 jets, backed by Japanese cryptomeria, pink flowering horse chestnut, and pin oaks.
- The Sunken Gardens – designed by Alfred Victor du Pont and Gabriel Masséna. Features large lake, grottoes, and 1930 statue by Charles-Marie Sarrabezolles (1888–1971). A. V. du Pont (1900–1970) was the only son of the owner and an architect trained at the École des Beaux-Arts in Paris.
- The Temple of Love – in classical style, with life-sized statue of Diana (1780) by Jean-Antoine Houdon.

== Restoration and renovation ==
The Nemours Estate reopened its gates on May 1, 2008, after closing in 2005 for a 3-year, $39 million renovation. The work, commissioned by the Nemours Foundation, was performed by world-class conservators, artisans and craftspeople who refurbished furniture, fabrics, tapestries, interior finishes, paintings, and sculptures. The comprehensive reconstruction included replacing the entire electrical system, draining and repairing the 800,000-gallon reflecting pool, and landscape restoration of the extensive formal gardens plantings, constructed design elements, and statuary.

== Litigation ==
In June 2012, the state of Delaware filed suit against the duPont Trust and Nemours Foundation, claiming the trustees were not following duPont's intentions, Delaware was not receiving their proper yearly distribution, and the $72 million renovation should not have been included in Delaware’s share of foundation distributions. Delaware Attorney General Beau Biden also objected to the Nemours Estate limiting access to 48 people per property tour, aged 13 and above only.

== Gallery ==
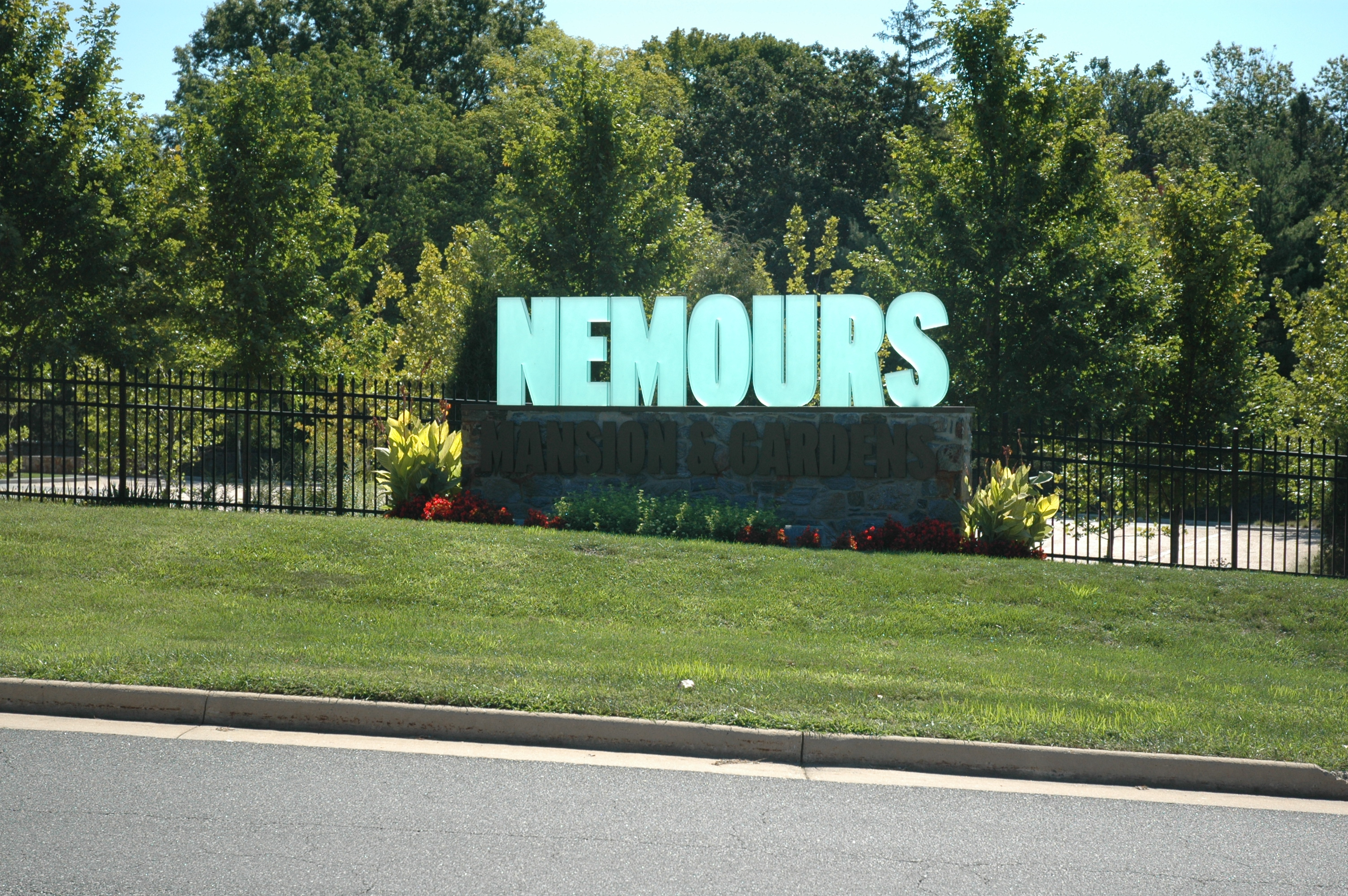
Entrance sign.

Bust located at the mansion.

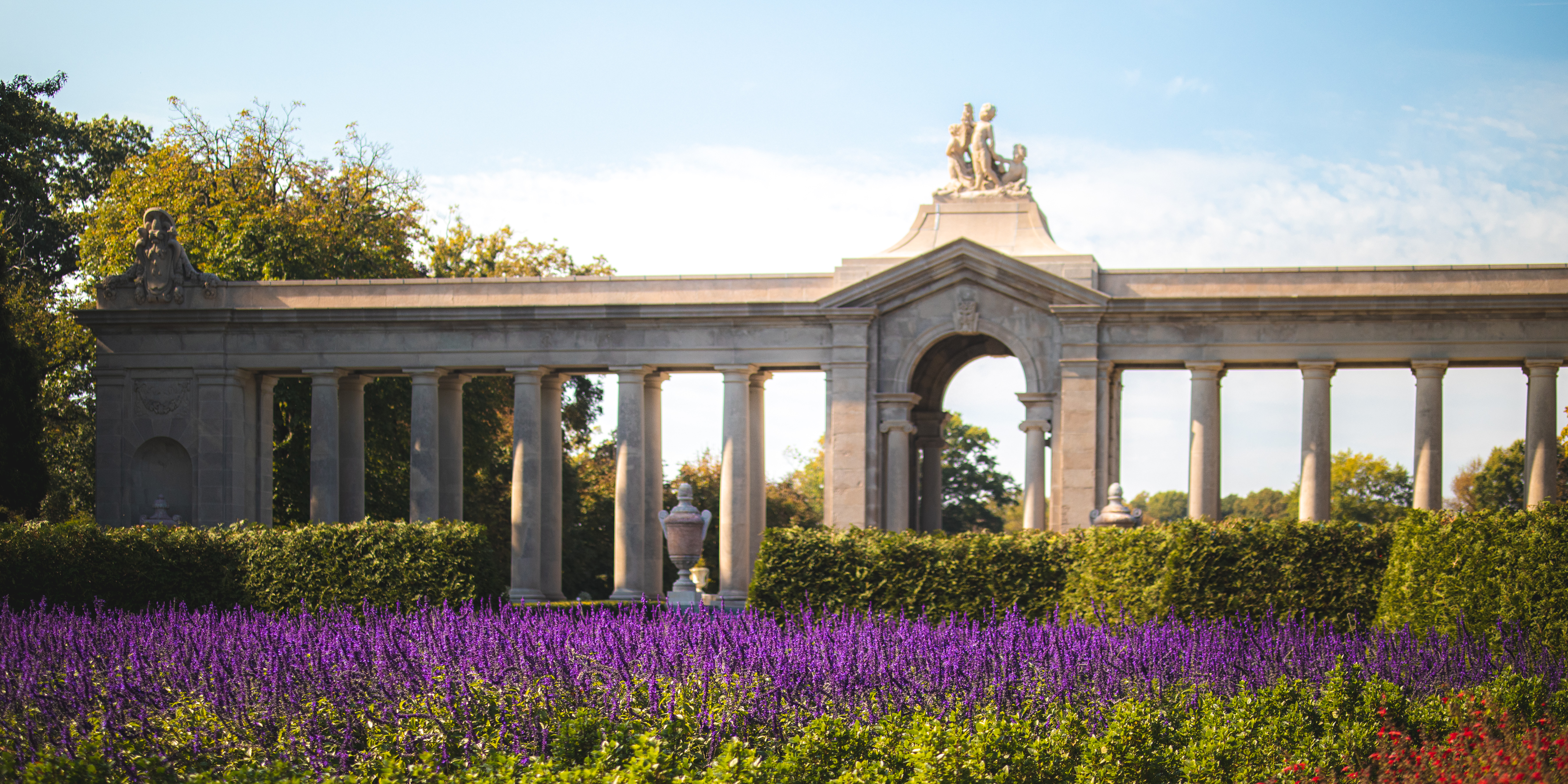
Colonnade.

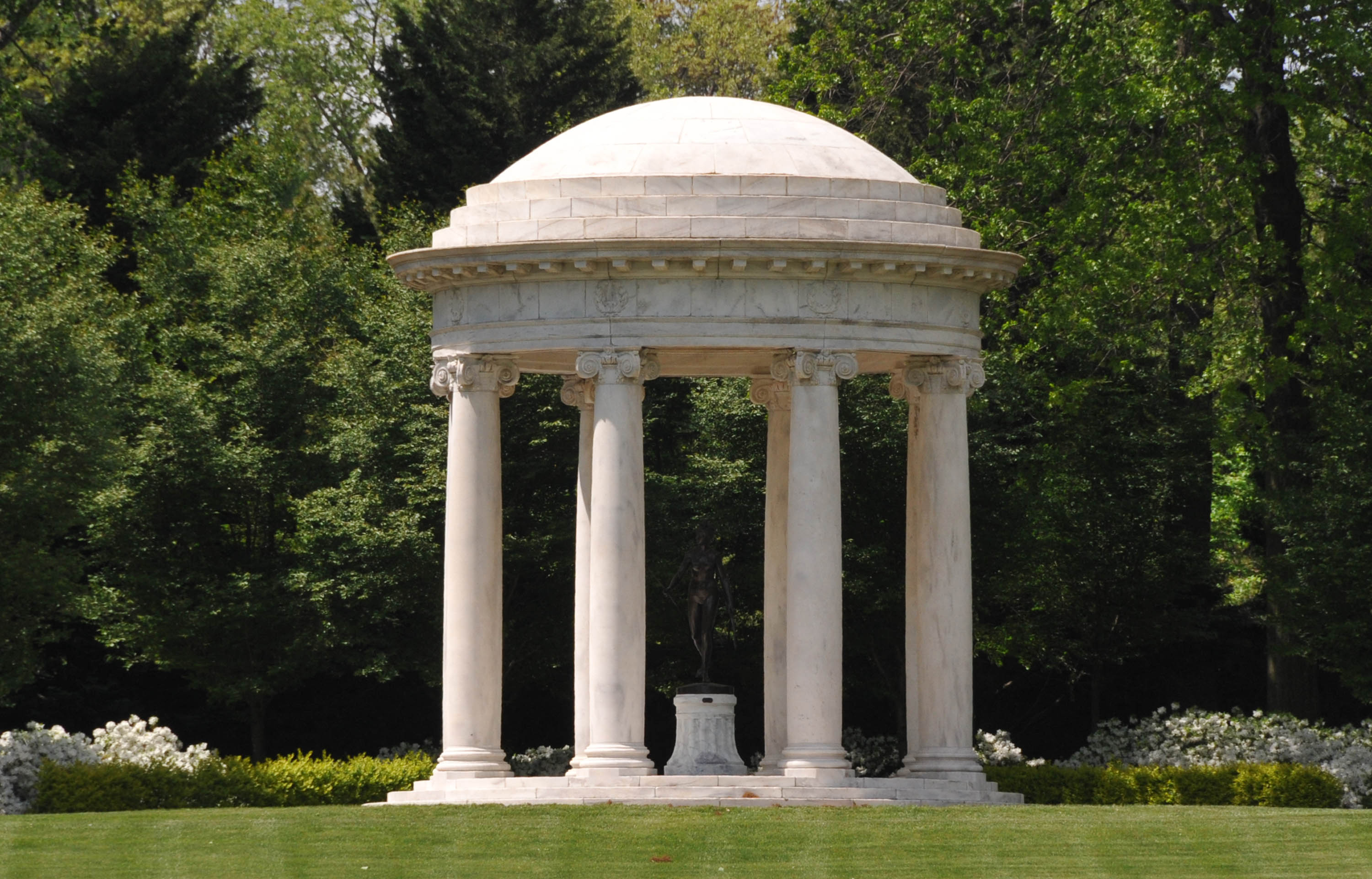
Temple of Love

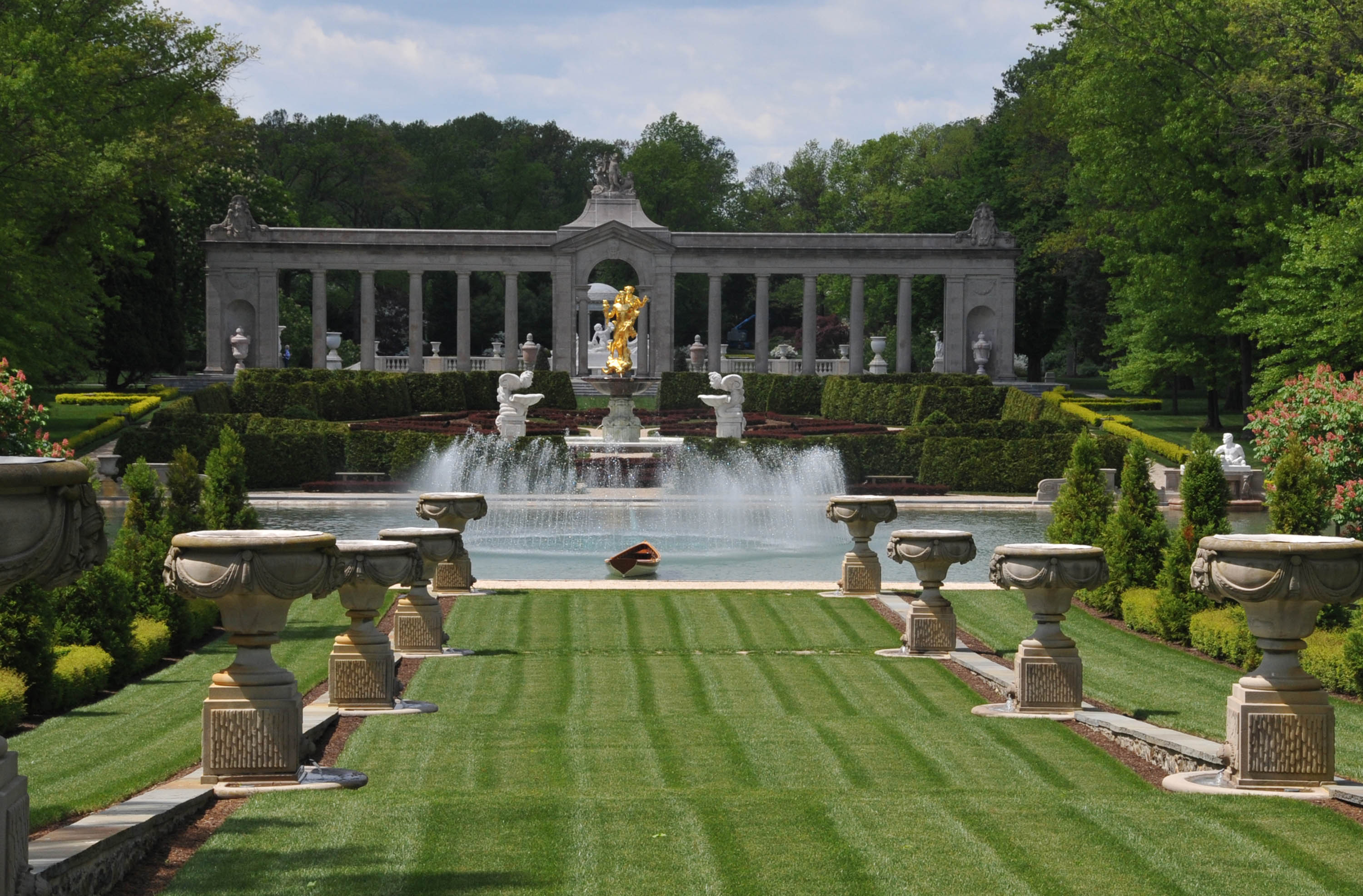
Reflecting pool with gold-plated statue.

== See also ==
- Buildings inspired by Versailles
- Hagley Museum and Library
- Longwood Gardens
- Winterthur Museum and Gardens
- Landscape design history
- List of botanical gardens in the United States
- List of museums in Delaware
