= Nemours Children's Hospital, Delaware =

Coordinates: 39.782215°N 75.555435°W

- Nemours Children's Health
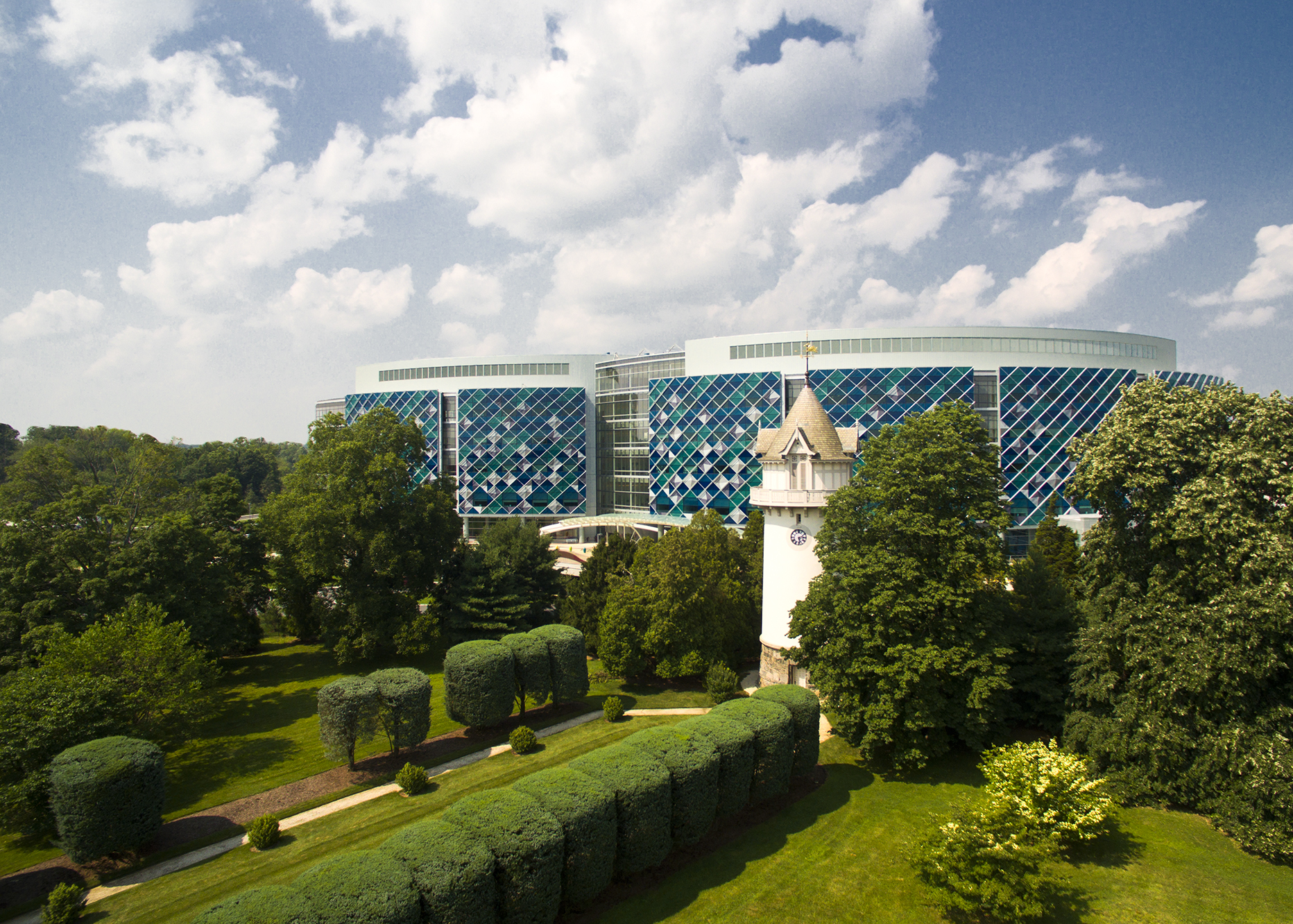
- Nemours Children's Hospital, Delaware as seen from the Nemours Estate

Geography
- Location: New Castle County, Delaware, United States

Organization
- Type: Specialty - Pediatrics
- Affiliated university: Thomas Jefferson University; University of Delaware
- Patron: The Nemours Foundation

Services
- Emergency department: Level I Pediatric Trauma Center
- Beds: 195

Helipads
- Helipad: FAA LID: 16DE
Number	Length		Surface
Number	ft	m	Surface
H1	50 x 50	15 x 15	concrete

History
- Founded: 1940

Links
- Website: www.nemours.org
- Lists: Hospitals in Delaware

Nemours Children's Hospital, Delaware is a pediatric hospital, located in unincorporated New Castle County, Delaware, with a Wilmington post office address. It is operated by the Nemours Foundation, a non-profit organization created through the last will and testament of philanthropist Alfred I. du Pont by his widow Jessie Ball duPont in 1936, and dedicated to improving children's health. Historically, it was referred to as the A. I. duPont Institute for Crippled Children or more simply, the duPont Institute and provides pediatric specialties and subspecialties to infants, children, teens, and young adults up to age 21.

Nemours Children's Hospital, Delaware, was the first freestanding children's hospital that is part of Nemours Children's Health, the nation's largest multi-state, multi-location pediatric health system. The hospital has achieved Magnet status multiple times and has several specialties consistently ranked by U.S. News & World Report's Top Children's Hospital awards. Additionally, it is recognized as an American College of Surgeons Children's Surgery Verified Hospital.

== History ==
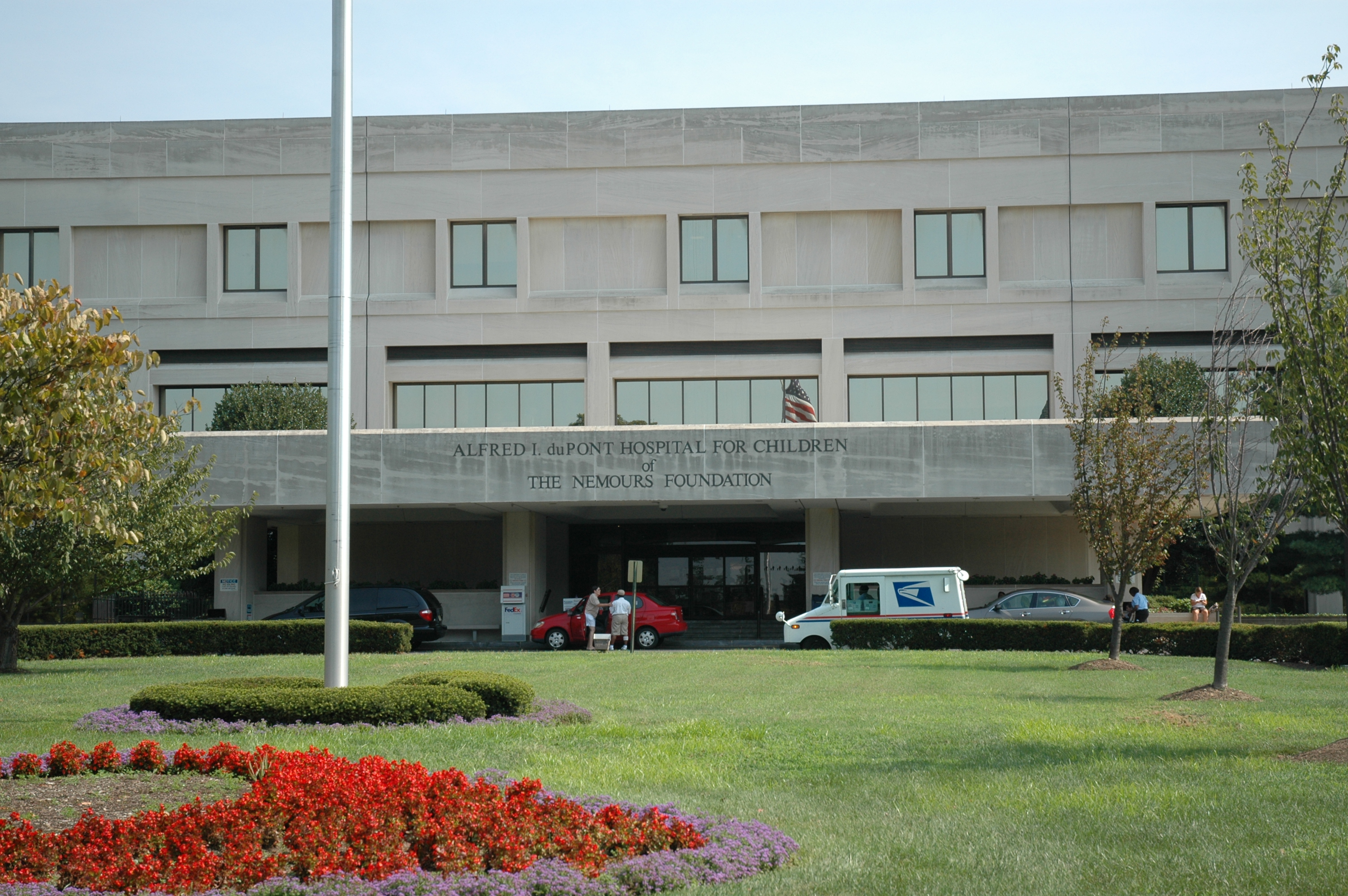
Main entrance of the Alfred I. duPont Hospital for Children

Alfred I. duPont established a trust composed of his holdings in E. I. du Pont de Nemours and Company which provided for the formation of The Nemours Foundation, named for the duPont family's home in France. The Nemours Foundation was incorporated in Florida in 1936. Nemours offers pediatric clinical care, research, education, advocacy and prevention programs.

In 1940, the original Alfred I. duPont Institute opened in Wilmington as a pediatric orthopedic institute. To address the shrinking availability of space and further expand services, planning for a new hospital began in 1972. Construction began in 1977 and progressed in phases until 1984, when the hospital was completed.

Nemours has grown to be one of the nation's largest children's health systems, caring for nearly half a million children each year at both the Delaware facility and Orlando, Florida, as well as 72 primary and specialty care practices. The hospital is part of the duPont legacy. It was named one of the nation's best children's hospitals by Parents Magazine in 2009. The institute is academically affiliated with both the University of Delaware in Newark and Thomas Jefferson University in Philadelphia, and the residency program is handled through Thomas Jefferson University Hospital.

On May 12, 2021, the hospital announced its name change to "Nemours Children's Hospital, Delaware."

As of December 2023, the duPont Charitable Trust's portfolio is worth almost $10 billion, which helps financially support Nemours Children's Health.

In January 2025, Nemours Children's Health and the State of Delaware launched a new payment model for children in the state’s Medicaid program. The model incentivizes keeping children healthy and out of the hospital, rather than reimbursing hospitals for the volume of medical services provided.

In April 2025, Nemours introduced a high school co-op program that provides students with practical experience as medical and nursing assistants, along with educational support.

In June 2025, Nemours announced that a Riverside location will open in the Kingswood Center.

== Facilities ==
The medical campus is located directly east of the DuPont Experimental Station and the site also houses the Nemours Estate. The facility provides Delaware's only Pediatric Trauma Center, advanced inpatient and outpatient pediatric care in more than 30 specialties, intensive and acute pediatric care, as well as pediatric research. The Ronald McDonald House of Delaware adjacent to the hospital provides sleep rooms and showers for the parents and families of children receiving treatment. In November 2023, Nemours donated $15,000 to Ronald McDonald House Charities.

Nemours Biomedical Research occupies the E400 building in the DuPont Experimental Station.

In October 2014, Nemours completed a 450,000-square-foot expansion project. The $256 million project increased the size of the Emergency Department and the number of inpatient beds.

In 2022, Nemours began a $40 million expansion in southeastern Pennsylvania in which the health system will open three new specialty care sites by the winter of 2024.

In May 2023, Nemours opened a specialized pediatric medical office in Broomall, Pennsylvania that includes doctors who are experts in more than 15 medical and surgical specialties.

In March 2023, Nemours opened a 43,000-square-foot facility in Chester County that will offer 18 medical and outpatient surgical specialties for children.

In January 2025, Nemours announced a $130 million expansion focused on neonatology, cancer and cardiology programs, and its maternal and fetal health program.

== Specialties ==
The hospital offers a comprehensive range of pediatric specialties and advanced surgical procedures, including kidney and bone marrow transplants and heart reconstruction. It is internationally recognized in blood and bone marrow transplantation, achondroplasia, cancer, cardiology and cardiac surgery, neurosurgery, orthopedics, and solid organ transplantation.

In March 2023, Nemours expanded cancer and blood disease research following a $78 million grant from the Lisa Dean Moseley Foundation.

In September 2023, Nemours received a $2.4 million grant to better support primary care access in underserved areas of Delaware.

In March 2025, the hospital celebrated the opening of the Lisa Dean Moseley Institute for Cancer and Blood Disorders on the fifth floor of its Wilmington hospital. It is a 24-bed facility. The facility will include 18 infusion and apheresis ambulatory rooms, along with 19 clinic rooms and a procedure room for cancer and blood disorder ambulatory pediatric patients.

In April 2025, Nemours Children's Health began providing on-site medical care and injury prevention services for youth players at the Philadelphia Union soccer academy.

In June 2025, Nemours Children's Health in Delaware began offering a new treatment for children with scoliosis, using technology called MAGnetic Expansion Control — or MAGEC rods to reduce the need for repeated surgeries.
