= CDS Global =

Multinational corporation

- Type: Subsidiary
- Industry: Business Process Outsourcing
- Founded: April 1, 1972
- Headquarters: Des Moines, Iowa, USA
- Area served: North America, U.K.
- Key people: Terry Rowinski, President
- Services: Customer Service; Data Management; Ecommerce; Order Management; Fulfillment; Payment; Mailing; Marketing; Warehousing & Distribution
- Number of employees: 2,400
- Parent: Hearst Corporation
- Website: www.cds-global.com

CDS Global, Inc. is a multinational corporation based in Des Moines, Iowa, that provides business process outsourcing and customer data management to various industries worldwide.

They handle 710 million consumer sales promotions, 65 million customer service interactions and 1 billion transactions annually, including 180 million payments totalling $7.1 billion, through 16 facilities in the U.S., and the U.K.

CDS Global is a wholly owned subsidiary of Hearst Corporation and is the largest magazine fulfillment house in North America.

== History ==
In 1971, Look magazine built a computer system that, for the first time, stored the names and addresses of their customers on magnetic tape.

Two months later, when Look ceased publication, six employees took this new fulfillment service to Edward Downe, Jr., publisher of Ladies Home Journal and The American Home. He agreed to be their first client, and owner, opening Downe Computer Services April 1, 1972, with 172 employees.

In 1977, the Charter Company in Jacksonville, Florida, bought out Downe Communications’ stock and renamed the company Charter Data Services (CDS).

Hearst Corporation acquired two Charter Company properties in 1982, Redbook and CDS, which they rechristened Communications Data Services and then, in 2007, CDS Global.

The number of magazine titles served increased as CDS Global acquired other fulfillment companies, including Tower Publishing and Optima in the U.K. and INDAS in Canada. Electronic payment capabilities were expanded when CDS Global acquired PayDQ in 2011.

== Divisions ==
CDS Global supports 1,141 brands with marketing, order management, order fulfillment, payment processing and document presentment services.

=== Media ===
CDS Global is the largest magazine fulfillment service provider, managing more than 1,000 print and digital magazine titles.

=== Non-profit ===
CDS Global provides donations processing, donor acknowledgements, marketing services and customer service to non-profits.

=== Higher education ===
CDS Global provides gift processing, donor/alumni acknowledgements, fulfillment services and customer service to higher education institutions.

=== Consumer products ===
CDS Global provides ecommerce and web store services, including cross-selling and conversion marketing.

=== Utilities ===
Public utilities use CDS Global’s electronic billing and payment services, with additional support for customer service, resource management, cash flow and regulatory compliance.

== Services ==
=== Customer service ===
Customer care agents deliver mail, online, email, chat and phone support, for billing, sales and level-one technical issues.

=== Data ===
CDS Global manages 159 million customer files for nearly 60 percent of the publishing industry and advises businesses on transactional, communication and service best practices.

=== Ecommerce ===
Client-branded web stores are supported by order management, payment processing, warehousing, fulfillment, distribution and customer service.

=== Mailing ===
Services include printing, personalization and presorting of acknowledgements, bills and renewals.

=== Marketing ===
710 million personalized print and digital communications, delivered via email, mail and phone. 95,000 online marketing pages managed.

=== Order management and fulfillment ===
In addition to physical product delivery, CDS Global handles subscriptions, recurring billings, digital access, and account services.

=== Payment ===
CDS Global supports paper, electronic, mobile, walk-in and interactive voice response options with:

- Electronic bill presentment and payment
- Lockbox and remittance processing
- Online banking and bill payment consolidation
- Bill printing and mailing services
- Data capture and image archive

=== Warehousing and distribution ===
Facilities in the U.S. and the U.K. provide inventory management, kitting and assembly, integration and logistics.
