= Leda Sanford =

American magazine editor

- Born: Leda Giovannetti; October 11, 1933; Pieve Fosciana, Lucca, Italy
- Died: August 3, 2025 (aged 91); Forestville, California, USA
- Education: Fashion Institute of Technology (B.S.)
- Occupations: Author, Speaker

Leda Sanford, (born October 11, 1933, in Lucca, Italy), was an Italian American author, speaker, publisher, and advertising director. She was the first female publisher of a major national magazine. She became president, publisher and editor-in-chief of the magazine American Home and the American Home Publishing Company in 1975.

Throughout her career, Sanford had publisher and director stints at several national magazines. She eventually focused her work on aging, which includes the publication of her collection of essays Look For the Moon in the Morning.

In 2010 she published a memoir, Pure Moxie, which focuses on her professional career.

== Professional career ==
When Sanford became president of the American Home Publishing Company, the company had recently been acquired by the Charter Company, headed by Raymond K. Mason. New York Times columnist Philip H. Dougherty reported in his “Advertising” column that Sanford had little experience in magazine publishing. Before her American Home installation, Sanford had been a design major at the Fashion Institute of Technology. She had served as editor of the trade publication Teens & Boys Outfitter for three years and also was editor of the publication Mens Wear for three years.

At American Home, Sanford led a controversial feminism-driven repositioning. Sanford replaced roughly half of the American Home staff (newspapers said she had started to “clean house”). The goal was to appeal to newly liberated women and save the magazine, which the Los Angeles Times reported as “financially ailing.”

American Home reported slight gains in 1976, but in 1977 the Charter Company announced the magazine would be combined into its magazine Redbook.

In March 1978 Sanford joined Chief Executive magazine as associate publisher and editor.

Sanford became publisher and editor-in-chief of entrepreneur Jeno Paulucci's magazine for Italian-Americans, Attenzione, in 1979. The magazine was sold to Adam Publications in 1982, after Sanford made an unsuccessful attempt to raise money to buy the magazine herself.

She was appointed to publisher of Bon Appétit magazine in May 1982. It was a short stint, and Sanford resigned from her position in March 1983.

In 1983 Sanford was appointed editorial director of the new magazine Living Anew — The Magazine for Living on your Own.

In 1986 Sanford became publisher of the U.S. edition of FMR magazine, Italian publisher Franco Maria Ricci's upscale art and culture review.

In March 1990 she became advertising director of Maturity Magazines Group, the New York office of Modern Maturity. In 2003, the company's bi-monthly magazine Modern Maturity was renamed AARP The Magazine.

Keeping her focus on the aging, she spent nine years (beginning in 1992) as vice president and senior editorial director of the targeted marketing division at the Age Wave Communications Corporation in Emeryville, California. Sanford was involved in the creation of the magazine “Get Up and Go!” The publication's target audience, women aged 40 to 50, was part of company's focus on how the boomer wave will change aging in America.

Leda Sanford has two children and two grandchildren. She resides in Mill Valley, California.
