= Pure Moxie =

Memoir by Leda Sanford

- Author: Leda Sanford
- Genre: Memoir
- Publisher: iUniverse
- Publication date: 2010

Pure Moxie is a memoir by Leda Sanford, the first female publisher of a major national magazine, The American Home. The memoir - self-published in 2010 by iUniverse - highlights Sanford's career in magazine publishing.

A review that ran in the Pacific Sun (newspaper) said Pure Moxie "is a book that is both a nostalgic look back (it's dedicated to Betty Friedan) at the post-Mad Men era—when General Motors and magazines were a big deal—and a nod toward the future, especially for increasingly creaky baby boomers, as Sanford became something of a visionary on promoting a new idea of aging and re-invention late in life."
