= Edward Downe Jr. =

American businessman and socialite (born 1929)

- Born: Edward Reynolds Downe Jr. August 31, 1929 (age 97)
- Education: Missouri School of Journalism
- Occupation: Businessman
- Spouses: Naomi Susan Campbell (div. 1977); Charlotte McDonnell Ford (m. 1986; died 2025)

Edward Reynolds Downe Jr. (born August 31, 1929) is an American businessman and socialite.

== Biography ==
Downe graduated from the University of Missouri's Missouri School of Journalism in 1952. He worked in a variety of capacities at two Virginia newspapers before joining True magazine. In 1954, he left True to become an editor at the rival magazine Argosy; he later moved into advertising at Argosy. In 1966, Downe purchased Family Weekly, a newspaper insert similar to Parade Magazine. He founded Downe Communications in 1967. Through this company he went on to acquire magazines including The Ladies' Home Journal, and The American Home. Downe eventually sold Downe Communications to the Charter Company, a Jacksonville, Florida-based oil and insurance conglomerate for approximately $9 million.

Downe divorced his first wife, Naomi Susan Campbell, in 1977. Downe married heiress Charlotte Ford (mother of Elena Ford) on his 57th birthday, August 31, 1986.

== Insider trading ==
In 1992, the Securities and Exchange Commission charged that in the mid- to late-1980s Downe and associated exchanged inside information in order to make illegal stock trades.

== Irish cottage controversy ==
In February 2009 the Hartford Courant ran a story concerning US senator Christopher Dodd's acquisition of his vacation home in Roundstone, Ireland. The article pointed out Dodd's close links to Downe, his disgraced former partner in buying the home. After paying an $11 million fine for his role in the scam, Downe later obtained a federal pardon in the waning days of the administration of Bill Clinton. The controversial pardon was granted after Dodd lobbied Clinton on Downe's behalf. Dodd later acquired the interests of his partners after the pardon was granted. Dodd was also criticized for claiming the Roundstone home was worth less than $250,000 in Senate ethics filings; some observers estimated the likely value in excess of $1 million USD.

== See also ==
- List of people pardoned or granted clemency by the president of the United States
  - List of people pardoned by Bill Clinton
