= Hubbard Cobb =

American writer

Hubbard Cobb (August 5, 1917 – September 27, 2006) was an American writer. A newspaper and radio personality, he was also the editor of The American Home and Ladies' Home Journal and the author of a number of books, including his 1950 debut Your Dream Home: How to Build It For Less Than $3500, The Amateur Builder's Handbook and 1970's The Dream House Encyclopedia. Cited as "an authority on home improvement and building", he was widely known in the Do it yourself publishing field, with a column running from the 1940s through the 1960s. He also spoke out about the unrealistic pressures on American women of the 1960s.

A native of New York City, Cobb was the son of Frank I. Cobb and Margaret Ayer Cobb. Both of his parents were writers. His father was a well-known columnist, editor of New York World.
