= Fourteen Points =

1918 U.S. peace proposals after World War I

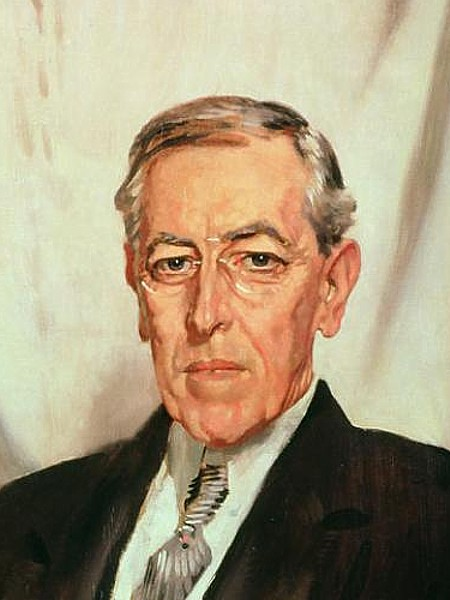
U.S. president Woodrow Wilson in a 1918 portrait

The Fourteen Points was a statement of principles for peace that was to be used for peace negotiations in order to end World War I. The principles were outlined in a January 8, 1918, speech on war aims and peace terms to the United States Congress by President Woodrow Wilson. However, his main Allied colleagues (Georges Clemenceau of France, David Lloyd George of the United Kingdom, and Vittorio Emanuele Orlando of Italy) were skeptical of the applicability of Wilsonian idealism.

The United States had joined the Triple Entente in fighting the Central Powers on April 6, 1917. Its entry into the war had in part been due to Germany's resumption of submarine warfare against merchant ships trading with France and Britain and also the interception of the Zimmermann telegram. However, Wilson wanted to avoid the United States' involvement in the long-standing European tensions between the great powers; if America was going to fight, he wanted to try to separate that participation in the war from nationalistic disputes or ambitions. The need for moral aims was made more important when, after the fall of the Russian government, the Bolsheviks disclosed secret treaties made between the Allies. Wilson's speech also responded to Vladimir Lenin's Decree on Peace of November 1917, immediately after the October Revolution in 1917.

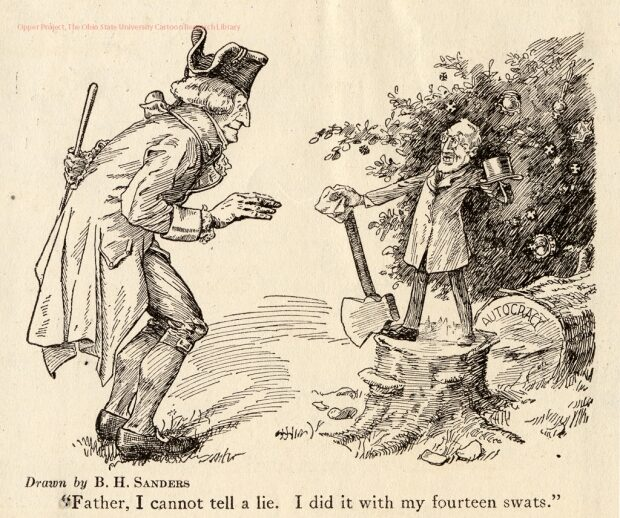
President Wilson tells George Washington that he destroys autocracy with his 14 points.

The speech made by Wilson took many domestic progressive ideas and translated them into foreign policy (free trade, open agreements, democracy and self-determination). Three days earlier, United Kingdom prime minister Lloyd George had made a speech setting out the UK's war aims which bore some similarity to Wilson's speech but which proposed reparations be paid by the Central Powers and which was more vague in its promises to the non-Turkish subjects of the Ottoman Empire. The Fourteen Points in the speech were based on the research of the Inquiry, a team of about 150 advisers led by foreign-policy adviser Edward M. House, into the topics likely to arise in the anticipated peace conference.

== Debates about the post-war world ==
The immediate cause of the United States' entry into World War I in April 1917 was the German announcement of renewed unrestricted submarine warfare and the subsequent sinking of ships with Americans on board. But President Wilson's war aims went beyond the defense of maritime interests. In his War Message to Congress, Wilson declared that the United States' objective was "to vindicate the principles of peace and justice in the life of the world." In several speeches earlier in the year, Wilson sketched out his vision of an end to the war that would bring a "just and secure peace," not merely "a new balance of power."

Congress had declared war on Germany on April 9, 1917, and until the 14 Points, Wilson's statements about American war aims had been rather vague, mostly limited to statements about being for democracy and against aggression. When Pope Benedict XV in a 1917 speech called for the immediate end of the war on the basis of the restoration of pre-1914 status quo, Wilson in a letter to the pontiff on August 27, 1917, rejected the pope's call for peace as he wrote: "Our response must be based on stern facts and upon nothing else...America wanted not a mere cessation of arms, but a stable and enduring peace." Wilson argued that he was rejecting the pope's peace message on moral grounds as he argued that a lasting peace would require "saving the free peoples of the world from the menace and the actual power of a vast military establishment controlled by an irresponsible government" that wanted to "dominate the world." Notably, Wilson was vague about what he considered to be a "stable and enduring peace" other than it required the defeat of Germany.

Wilson in his speeches and letters was always careful to make a distinction between Germany's "criminal" government and the German people. At least part of the distinction was due to his knowledge of the political crisis in Germany. In 1914, the majority of the Social Democrats (SPD) – the largest party in the Reichstag – supported the war, believing the government's statements that Russia was about to attack Germany. The SPD joined the other Reichstag parties in the Burgfrieden ("peace-within-a-castle-under-siege") in which the parties agreed not criticize the government in its handling of the war. The SPD made it clear, however, that their support was for a defensive war only and that they opposed a war of conquest. From the beginning, the left wing of the Social Democrats opposed the war on the grounds that the German working class had no quarrel with the working classes of France, Britain and Russia. In 1917, the party split over the issue of the war, with the anti-war faction forming the Independent Social Democratic Party. By then, the Majority Social Democrats were also becoming increasingly disenchanted, as discussions about the war often centered on annexations, making it apparent that the allegedly defensive war was in fact a war of conquest. The Majority Social Democrats voted with the Catholic Centre Party and various left-liberal parties in July 1917 for the Reichstag Peace Resolution, which called for a negotiated peace without annexations. The resolution was only symbolic with no binding power over the government, but it was an important step towards the Reichstag developing a voice for peace and for parliamentarization.

President Wilson subsequently initiated a secret series of studies named the Inquiry, primarily focused on Europe, and carried out by a group in New York which included geographers, historians and political scientists; the group was directed by Edward M. House. Their job was to study Allied and American policy in virtually every region of the globe and analyze economic, social, and political facts likely to come up in discussions during the peace conference. The group produced and collected nearly 2,000 separate reports and documents plus at least 1,200 maps. Walter Lippmann of "the Inquiry" defined the main American war aim as "the disestablishment of a Prussian Middle Europe" and to find a way to prevent Germany from being "the master of the continent" after the war.

The Armenian genocide that began in April 1915 attracted much media attention in the Allied nations at the time, and throughout the summer and fall of 1917 Wilson had been the subject of fierce criticism by Republican politicians such as the former president Theodore Roosevelt and Senator Henry Cabot Lodge for his unwillingness to ask Congress to declare war on the Ottoman Empire. In a foreshadowing of the "Germany First" strategy of World War Two, Wilson and other senior figures in his administration argued that the United States should commit its power to defeat the German Empire first and that any operations against the Sublime Porte would be a waste of American resources. Wilson argued that Germany was an advanced, industrial nation while the Ottoman Empire was a backward nation with almost no modern industries, and as such the defeat of Germany would automatically lead to the defeat of the Ottoman Empire. Both Roosevelt and Cabot Lodge argued in various speeches and columns that the United States had a moral duty to stop the Armenian genocide by declaring war on the Ottoman Empire. Roosevelt, in his syndicated newspaper column in the Kansas City Star, accused Wilson of crying "crocodile tears" over the Armenian genocide as he maintained that if he was still president the United States would have already ended the genocide. In response to such criticism, Wilson had asked Colonel House and the authors of "the Inquiry" such as Lippmann to come up with a plan to protect the Armenians after the hoped for Allied victory, even though the United States was not at war with the Ottoman Empire. The parts of the 14 Points relating to the Near East where the emphasis was upon protecting minority rights were at least in part designed to rebut the criticism that the Wilson administration was indifferent to the genocide being waged in Anatolia.

The purpose of the Armenian genocide together with the related genocides against the Pontic Greeks and the Assyrians was to achieve the "homogenization" of Asia Minor. Colonel House advised Wilson that the genocidal "homogenization" of Anatolia required an American response, writing to the president: "It is necessary to free the subject races of the Turkish empire from oppression and misrule. This implies at very least autonomy for Armenia". House wrote in his diary: "After the Turkish paragraph had been written, the President thought it might be more specific and that Armenia, Mesopotamia and other parts be mentioned by name. I disagreed with this, believing that what was said was sufficient to indicate this, and it finally stood as framed".Though the genocidal policies of the Committee of Union and Progress regime were not referenced by name in the 14 Points, the emphasis on protecting the rights of minorities under the Sublime Porte together with what was described with some understatement as the "undoubted security of life" was an implicit response to such policies. The studies culminated in a speech by Wilson to Congress on January 8, 1918, wherein he articulated America's long-term war objectives. The speech was the clearest expression of intention made by any of the belligerent nations, and it projected Wilson's progressive domestic policies into the international arena.

In November 1917, the Bolsheviks led by Vladimir Lenin overthrew the Russian Provisional Government in Petrograd. The next day, Lenin issued the Decree On Peace which called for the immediate end to the war on the basis of a "just and democratic peace", which he defined as "a peace without annexations or indemnitees"; national self-determination in place of the traditional power politics; and the end of secret diplomacy. Lenin repudiated the foreign policy of Imperial Russia, and published the secret treaties that the former regime had signed with the Allies under which the Allies had envisioned extensive territorial changes and divided much of the world up into spheres of influence. Lenin surrendered all Russian extraterritorial rights and concessions in China with the notable exception of the Russian-owned Chinese Eastern Railroad. This won the new Bolshevik regime much prestige in China, to the discomfort of the other powers that held extraterritorial rights there. The publication of the secret treaties relating to Europe, Africa, China and the Near East caused the governments of Great Britain, France, Italy, and Japan much embarrassment at the time as the secret treaties made it appear that the Allied leaders were only self-interested. The publication was especially embarrassing for the Allies as the former government of Russia had signed no secret treaties with Germany, the Austrian empire, or the Ottoman Empire, and thus the war aims of the Central powers remained secret. Lenin accused the Allied leaders of being selfish while presenting himself as an idealist who sought the betterment of ordinary people by rejecting imperialism.

Wilson, in common with other world leaders, were afraid of the possibility of Communist revolutions inspired by the Russian example breaking out elsewhere, and decided to offer his set of idealistic war aims as a way to challenge Lenin's claims to the moral high ground. The American historian Erik Goldstein wrote that Wilson created the 14 Points largely "...to provide an ideological alternative to Lenin and his Communist regime". When drafting the 14 Points alongside his close adviser and friend, Colonel House, Wilson mostly spoke about Russia. The American historian N. M. Phelps wrote that in January 1918 Wilson "...needed to seize the moment if he was going to avoid being eclipsed by Lenin's competing program for the postwar world".

== Speech ==
Original Fourteen Points speech, January 8, 1918.

The speech, known as the Fourteen Points, was developed from a set of diplomatic points by Wilson and territorial points drafted by the Inquiry's general secretary, Walter Lippmann, and his colleagues, Isaiah Bowman, Sidney Mezes, and David Hunter Miller. Lippmann's draft territorial points were a direct response to the secret treaties of the European Allies, which Lippmann had been shown by Secretary of War Newton D. Baker. Lippmann's task, according to House, was "to take the secret treaties, analyze the parts which were tolerable, and separate them from those which were regarded as intolerable, and then develop a position which conceded as much to the Allies as it could, but took away the poison.... It was all keyed upon the secret treaties."

In the speech, Wilson directly addressed what he perceived as the causes for the world war by calling for the abolition of secret treaties, a reduction in armaments, an adjustment in colonial claims in the interests of both native peoples and colonists, and freedom of the seas. Wilson also made proposals that would ensure world peace in the future. For example, he proposed the removal of economic barriers between nations, the promise of self-determination for national minorities, and a world organization that would guarantee the "political independence and territorial integrity [of] great and small states alike" – a League of Nations.

Though Wilson's idealism pervaded the Fourteen Points, he also had more practical objectives in mind. He hoped to keep Russia in the war by convincing the Bolsheviks that they would receive a better peace from the Allies, to bolster Allied morale, and to undermine German war support. The address was well received in the United States and Allied nations and even by Bolshevik leader Vladimir Lenin, as a landmark of enlightenment in international relations. Wilson subsequently used the Fourteen Points as the basis for negotiating the Treaty of Versailles, which ended the war.

== Text ==
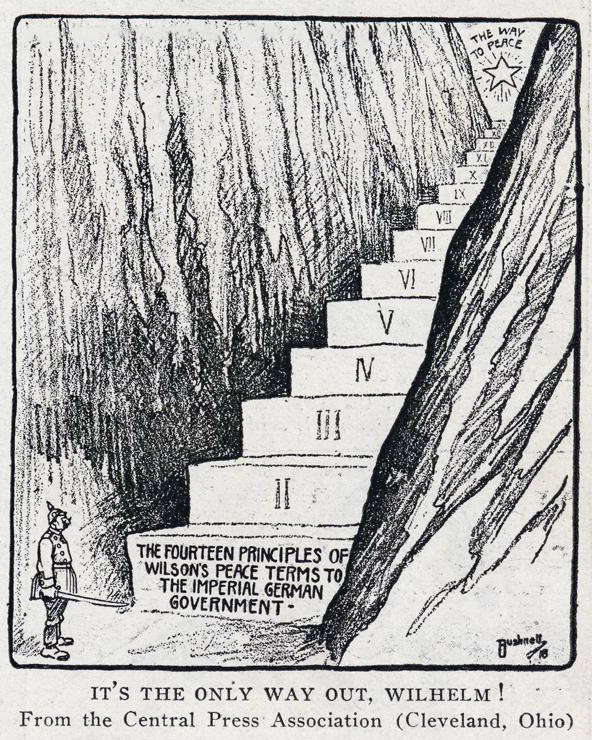
Wilson's Fourteen Points as the only way to peace for German government, American political cartoon, 1918.

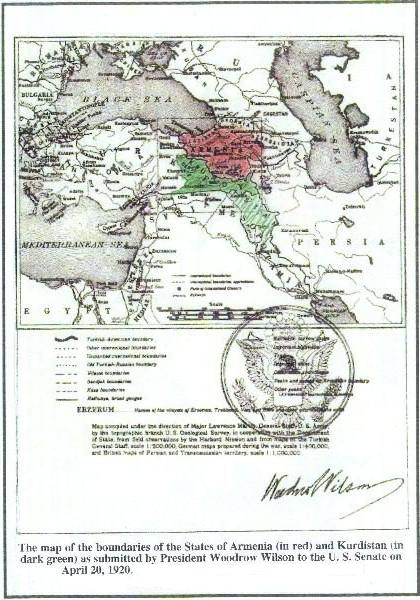
Map of Wilsonian Armenia and Kurdistan. The borders decision was made by Wilson.

In his speech to Congress, President Wilson declared fourteen points which he regarded as the only possible basis of an enduring peace:

I. Open covenants of peace, openly arrived at, after which there shall be no private international understandings of any kind but diplomacy shall proceed always frankly and in the public view.

II. Absolute freedom of navigation upon the seas, outside territorial waters, alike in peace and in war, except as the seas may be closed in whole or in part by international action for the enforcement of international covenants.

III. The removal, so far as possible, of all economic barriers and the establishment of an equality of trade conditions among all the nations consenting to the peace and associating themselves for its maintenance.

IV. Adequate guarantees given and taken that national armaments will be reduced to the lowest point consistent with domestic safety.

V. A free, open-minded, and absolutely impartial adjustment of all colonial claims, based upon a strict observance of the principle that in determining all such questions of sovereignty the interests of the populations concerned must have equal weight with the equitable government whose title is to be determined.

VI. The evacuation of all Russian territory and such a settlement of all questions affecting Russia as will secure the best and freest cooperation of the other nations of the world in obtaining for her an unhampered and unembarrassed opportunity for the independent determination of her own political development and national policy and assure her of a sincere welcome into the society of free nations under institutions of her own choosing; and, more than a welcome, assistance also of every kind that she may need and may herself desire. The treatment accorded Russia by her sister nations in the months to come will be the acid test of their good will, of their comprehension of her needs as distinguished from their own interests, and of their intelligent and unselfish sympathy.

VII. Belgium, the whole world will agree, must be evacuated and restored, without any attempt to limit the sovereignty which she enjoys in common with all other free nations. No other single act will serve as this will serve to restore confidence among the nations in the laws which they have themselves set and determined for the government of their relations with one another. Without this healing act the whole structure and validity of international law is forever impaired.

VIII. All French territory should be freed and the invaded portions restored, and the wrong done to France by Prussia in 1871 in the matter of Alsace-Lorraine, which has unsettled the peace of the world for nearly fifty years, should be righted, in order that peace may once more be made secure in the interest of all.

IX. A readjustment of the frontiers of Italy should be effected along clearly recognizable lines of nationality.

X. The people of Austria-Hungary, whose place among the nations we wish to see safeguarded and assured, should be accorded the freest opportunity to autonomous development.

XI. Romania, Serbia, and Montenegro should be evacuated; occupied territories restored; Serbia accorded free and secure access to the sea; and the relations of the several Balkan states to one another determined by friendly counsel along historically established lines of allegiance and nationality; and international guarantees of the political and economic independence and territorial integrity of the several Balkan states should be entered into.

XII. The Turkish portion of the present Ottoman Empire should be assured a secure sovereignty, but the other nationalities which are now under Ottoman rule should be assured an undoubted security of life and an absolutely unmolested opportunity of autonomous development, and the Dardanelles should be permanently opened as a free passage to the ships and commerce of all nations under international guarantees.

XIII. An independent Polish state should be erected which should include the territories inhabited by indisputably Polish populations, which should be assured a free and secure access to the sea, and whose political and economic independence and territorial integrity should be guaranteed by international covenant.

XIV. A general association of nations must be formed under specific covenants for the purpose of affording mutual guarantees of political independence and territorial integrity to great and small states alike.

== Reaction ==
=== Allies ===
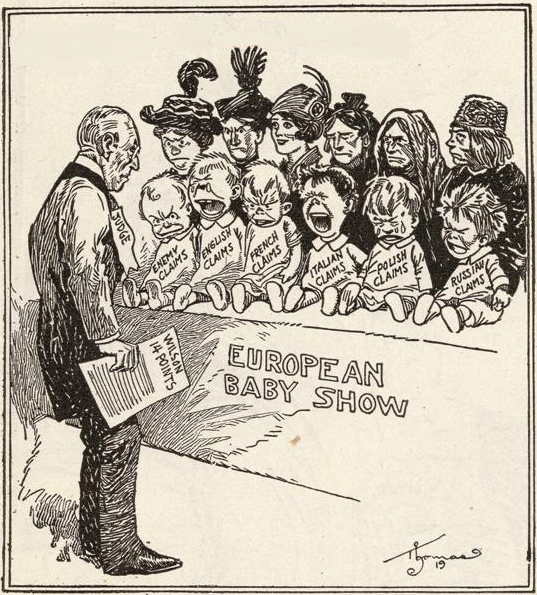
Wilson with his 14 points choosing between competing claims. Babies represent the rival claims of the British, French, Italians, Poles, Russians, and the enemy states. American political cartoon, 1919.

Wilson at first considered abandoning his speech after the British prime minister David Lloyd George delivered a speech outlining British war aims, many of which were similar to Wilson's aspirations, at Caxton Hall on January 5, 1918. Lloyd George stated that he had consulted leaders of "the Great Dominions overseas" before making his speech, so it would appear that Canada, Australia, New Zealand, South Africa and Newfoundland were in broad agreement. Lloyd George stated that the British war aims were "self-determination" for the subject peoples of the Austrian and Ottoman empires. Wilson was persuaded by his adviser House to go ahead, and Wilson's speech overshadowed Lloyd George's and is better remembered by posterity.

Wilson's speech was made without prior coordination or consultation with Wilson's counterparts in Europe. The British response was a delicate balancing act. The government leaders publicly welcomed the speech to maintain Allied unity and appeal to war-weary citizens. However their private reaction ranged from skepticism to outright rejection of specific points that threatened the British Empire. In France, Clemenceau, upon hearing of the Fourteen Points, was said to have sarcastically proclaimed, "The good Lord had only ten!" (Le bon Dieu n'en avait que dix !).

As a major public statement of war aims, it became the basis for the terms of the German surrender at the end of the First World War. After the speech, Colonel House worked to secure the acceptance of the Fourteen Points by Entente leaders. On October 16, 1918, President Woodrow Wilson and Sir William Wiseman, the head of British intelligence in America, had an interview. This interview was one reason why the German government accepted the Fourteen Points and the stated principles for peace negotiations.

The report was made as negotiation points, and the Fourteen Points were later accepted by France and Italy on November 1, 1918. Britain later signed off on all of the points except the freedom of the seas. The United Kingdom also wanted Germany to make reparation payments for the war, and thought that should be added to the Fourteen Points. The speech was delivered 10 months before the Armistice with Germany and became the basis for the terms of the German surrender, as negotiated at the Paris Peace Conference in 1919.

=== Central Powers ===
The speech was widely disseminated as an instrument of Allied propaganda and was translated into many languages for global dissemination. Copies were also dropped behind German lines, to encourage the Central Powers to surrender in the expectation of a just settlement. The German government rejected the 14 Points as the basis of a peace settlement. The duumvirate that ruled Germany that consisted of Field Marshal Paul von Hindenburg and General Erich Ludendorff were supremely confident that the offensive planned for March 1918 code-named Operation Michael would win the war. The German spring offensive of 1918 did make gains, but fell far short of being the decisive victory that Hindenburg and Ludendorff had expected. By the summer of 1918, the Allies were winning the war and on September 28, 1918, Ludendorff advised the Emperor Wilhelm II that the Reich was defeated and the best that the Germany could now hope to achieve would be an armistice that preserved Germany as a great power. Neither Hindenburg nor Ludendorff intended to take any responsibility for their failures as generals and rather cynically forced the Kaiser to bring about democratic reforms as a way to ensure the responsibility for the defeat fell on the shoulders of others. Ludendorff in particular gave a somewhat distorted version of the 14 points as a way to entice Prince Max of Baden to form a new government that would seek an armistice. Indeed, in a note sent to Wilson, Prince Maximilian of Baden, the German imperial chancellor, in October 1918 requested an immediate armistice and peace negotiations on the basis of the Fourteen Points.

In Asia Minor, the 14 Points caused some confusion as the Muslim peoples living there defined themselves in terms of religion rather than language and ethnicity. Almost all of the Kurdish population of Anatolia at the time defined themselves as Muslims rather than as Kurds, and were loyal to the Sublime Porte under the grounds that Sultan-Caliph was the supreme leader of all Sunni Muslims worldwide. There was confusion on the part of both the Allies and the Kurds themselves if the Kurds were one of the "non-Turkish" groups promised autonomy in the Ottoman Empire by the 14 points.

=== United States ===
Theodore Roosevelt, in a January 1919 article titled, "The League of Nations", published in Metropolitan Magazine, warned: "If the League of Nations is built on a document as high-sounding and as meaningless as the speech in which Mr. Wilson laid down his fourteen points, it will simply add one more scrap to the diplomatic waste paper basket. Most of these fourteen points... would be interpreted... to mean anything or nothing."

Senator William Borah after 1918 wished "this treacherous and treasonable scheme" of the League of Nations to be "buried in hell" and promised that if he had his way it would be "20,000 leagues under the sea".

=== Other countries ===
Wilson's speech regarding the Fourteen Points led to unintentional but important consequences in regards to countries which were under European colonial rule or under the influence of European countries. In many of the Fourteen Points, specifically points X, XI, XII and XIII, Wilson had focused on adjusting colonial disputes and the importance of allowing autonomous development and self-determination. This drew significant attention from anti-colonial nationalist leaders and movements, who saw Wilson's swift adoption of the term "self-determination" (although he did not actually use the term in the speech itself) as an opportunity to gain independence from colonial rule or expel foreign influence.

Consequently, Wilson gained support from anti-colonial nationalist leaders in Europe's colonies and countries under European influence around the globe who were hopeful that Wilson would assist them in their goals. Around the world, Wilson was occasionally elevated to a quasi-religious figure; as someone who was an agent of salvation and a bringer of peace and justice. During this 'Wilsonian moment', there was considerable optimism among anti-colonial nationalist leaders and movements that Wilson and the Fourteen Points were going to be an influential force that would re-shape the long established relationships between the West and the rest of the world. Many of them believed that the United States, given its history (particularly the American Revolution) would be sympathetic towards the goals and aspirations they held. A common belief among anti-colonial nationalist leaders was the U.S., once it had assisted them in gaining independence from colonial rule or foreign influence, would establish new relationships which would be more favorable and equitable than what had existed beforehand.

However, the nationalist interpretations of both the Fourteen Points and Wilson's views regarding colonialism proved to be misguided. In actuality, Wilson had never established a goal of opposing European colonial powers and breaking up their empires, nor was he trying to fuel anti-colonial nationalist independence movements. It was not Wilson's objective or desire to confront European colonial powers over such matters, as Wilson had no intention of supporting any demands for self-determination and sovereignty that conflicted with the interests of the victorious Allies.

In reality, Wilson's calls for greater autonomous development and sovereignty had been aimed solely at European countries under the rule of the German, Austro-Hungarian and Ottoman empires. He did not explicitly outline this, although it is clear that his calls for greater sovereignty in these regions was in an effort to try and destabilise those enemies' empires. President Wilson's ambitions for the third world were rather to attempt to influence its development in order to transform it from 'backward' to 'sophisticated', the aim being to incorporate it into the commercial world, so that the U.S. could further benefit from trade with the global south. Furthermore, Wilson did not believe the third world was ready for self governance, asserting that a period of trusteeship and tutelage from colonial powers was required to manage such a transition. Wilson viewed this approach as essential to the 'proper development' of colonised countries, reflecting his views about the inferiority of the non-European races. Moreover, Wilson was not by character or background an anti-colonialist or campaigner for rights and freedoms for all people, instead he was also very much a racist, a fundamental believer in white supremacy. For example, he had supported the 1898 U.S. annexation of the Philippines whilst condemning the rebellion of the Philippine nationalist Emilio Aguinaldo, and strongly believed that the U.S. was morally obliged to impose Western ways of life and governance on such countries, so that eventually they could govern independently.

== Lippmann's and Cobb's October 1918 analysis of the Fourteen Points ==
In late October 1918, President Wilson's close adviser Colonel House asked Frank I. Cobb and Walter Lippmann to write an analysis of the Fourteen Points which he then sent to US Secretary of State Robert Lansing. In this analysis, Cobb and Lippmann elaborated on each of the Fourteen Points in extremely great detail.

This analysis argued that the Fourteen Points prohibits secret treaties and selective trade discrimination against specific League of Nations states. Also, these points only require a reconsideration of colonial claims in regards to the Central Powers' (such as the German Empire's colonial empires), not the Entente's colonial empires. These points also require, in Lippmann's and Cobb's opinion, the creation of independent states on Russia's periphery, not only in Poland, which is covered in a separate point, but also separate states for Finns, Estonians, Latvians, Lithuanians, and Ukrainians, drawns as much as possible based on ethnic lines but with their economic viability being preserved and with no kinds of dynastic ties to the royal houses of Hohenzollern, Hapsburg, and Romanov ever being allowed. These states should also be given the opportunity to federate with Russia in the future, especially a non-Bolshevik Russia. Central Asia, also known as Muslim Russia, should perhaps be given some kind of limited protectorate by some mandatory power. The treaties of Brest-Litovsk and Bucharest "must be cancelled as palpably fraudulent", with all German troops being required to withdraw from Russia.

Belgium should be able to claim reparations for its entire cost of World War I, while France should also be able to claim reparations for the damage to its northeastern departments as a result of German occupation, since the German invasion and occupation of Belgium, a neutral country, in 1914 (until 1918) was completely illegal, but war between Germany and France was not a violation of international law back in 1914. France should be allowed to reacquire all of Alsace-Lorraine but should be denied its claim to the coal-rich Saarland, which is a direct violation of the principle of national self-determination and thus of the Fourteen Points. Luxembourg's people should be free to decide their own fate and to determine their own future destiny. Italy should be allowed to annex both the Trentino and overwhelmingly German South Tyrol all of the way up to the Brenner Pass to achieve maximum security against a future Greater Germany that engages in Anschluss by annexing Austria, but South Tyrol should get maximum autonomy under Italian rule and its ethnic Germans should not be conscripted into the Italian army. Trieste and Fiume should be placed under Italian sovereignty but also be made free ports so that both Italy and Yugoslavia could use them. Italy should be given a protectorate in Albania but with Albania's local life guaranteed by the League of Nations.

According to this analysis, the United States should support the redrawing of Austria-Hungary's former territories' borders along ethnic lines, based on the principle of national self-determination, as newly independent countries since the collapse and break-up of Austria-Hungary is now a fait accompli and thus cannot be reversed. So, Serbia, now Yugoslavia, should annex the South Slav lands, Romania should annex Transylvania, the Banat, Bukovina, and Bessarabia, an independent Czechoslovakia should be recognized, at cetera. The borders of the Ottoman Empire should also be redrawn along ethnic lines, with Anatolia being reserved for the Turks, Constantinople and the Bosporus Straits possibly remaining nominally Turkish but being put under international control, an independent Armenia being created with its very own port on the Mediterranean Sea, with France or Britain as its mandatory power. The Arab lands should become nominally independent but actually French (Syria) or British (Palestine, Mesopotamia, and Arabia) League of Nations mandates. Strong minority protections should be put in place throughout these countries and territories. And the trunk railroad lines in the Middle East should be internationalized.

For Poland, the crucial question is whether it would obtain a land corridor to connect itself to the sea, which would cut off German-majority East Prussia from the rest of Germany, or whether the Vistula River will be internationalized and Danzig will be made a free port. Poland should be given no Lithuanian-majority or Ukrainian-majority territories. Germans and Jews should get strong minority protections in Poland, especially if Poland will get Posen and Upper Silesia. And an impartial census might need to be taken to determine the exact extent of "indisputably" Polish territories. Also, the creation of a League of Nations for the establishment of a permanent peace after the end of World War I is absolutely, extremely vital.

== Treaty of Versailles ==
In Germany, the 14 Points became a symbol of the promised basis of the peace after the war and, throughout the interwar period, it was common in Germany to attack the Treaty of Versailles as illegitimate, with the argument being made that it was contrary to the 14 Points.

Notably, Article 231 of the Treaty of Versailles, which became known as the War Guilt Clause, was seen by the Germans as assigning full responsibility for the war and its damages on Germany; however, the same clause was included in all peace treaties and historian Sally Marks has noted that only German diplomats saw it as assigning responsibility for the war. The Allies initially assessed 269 billion marks in reparations. In 1921, this figure was established at 192 billion marks. However, only a fraction of the total had to be paid. The figure was designed to look imposing and show the public that Germany was being punished, but it also recognized what Germany could not realistically pay. Germany's ability and willingness to pay that sum continues to be a topic of debate among historians. Sharp wrote the intention at the Paris peace conference was for the Allied leaders to first gather together to agree to a common set of peace terms and then negotiate with the Germans, hence the tendency of the various delegations to make maximum demands out of the expectation that they would receive less when the final treaty was negotiated with the Germans. When the Allied leaders gathered together in January 1919, it took them so long to agree to a set of common terms that they chose not to negotiate with the Germans when they presented their demands on May 7, 1919, least the fragile consensus break down, forcing them to start all over again. Sharp wrote that far from being evidence of Allied bad faith and cruelty, the refusal to negotiate with the Germans reflected a very real desire on the part of the Allied delegations to finally end the peace conference and go home. In the interwar period, the Germans often attacked the Treaty of Versailles under the grounds that point one calling for treaties to be openly negotiated was ignored and that the Treaty of Versailles was a dikat (dictate) imposed by the Allies. Sharp argued that point one of the 14 points was disregarded even by Wilson during the Paris peace conference as open diplomacy would have made negotiating the peace even more difficult and cumbersome. He also argued that in the case of Italy that open diplomacy proved to be a handicap, and the traditional secret diplomacy might have worked better. The Italian prime minister Vittorio Orlando was inclined to compromise in pressing for Italy's claims, but was trapped by the Bolshevik publication of the Treaty of London in 1917, leading to intense domestic pressure not to compromise on any point of the Treaty of London. Sharp argued that Wilson was a victim of his own rhetoric as he made a series of idealistic speeches painting the post-war world as a picture of absolute moral perfection that people would inevitably be disillusioned when they actually saw the terms of the Treaty of Versailles as no peace treaty ever match Wilson's rhetoric. In this way, the 14 points became a symbol of Wilson's failure to match his rhetoric, and much of the abuse directed at the Treaty of Versailles reflected a broader sense of let-down as the post-war world did not match the promises made during the war. Sharp wrote that the Treaty of Versailles was very much a compromise that reflected diverse and often contradictory American, British, French, Italian and other interests and no leader can be realistically credited with being the sole "author" of the treaty. Sharp also noted that Wilson like the other Allied leaders had to cater to domestic concerns as opposition to Asian immigration into the United States which led him to oppose the Japanese-inspired Racial Equality Clause, which led Sharp to question whether the peace conference could be only explained solely in terms of the personalities of the leaders.

The German-born American historian Gerhard Weinberg noted that the entire question of the "justice" of the Treaty of Versailles as a source of European discord is irrelevant. Weinberg noted that the vast majority of Germans in the interwar period believed that their country had actually won World War One with the Reich only being defeated by the alleged "stab-in-the-back" that was the November Revolution of 1918. Weinberg wrote that there was nothing the Allies could have done to reconcile those Germans who believed in the Dolchstoßlegende that Germany had actually won the war in 1918 with the reality of their defeat. Weinberg wrote that given the way that the majority of Germans believed in the Dolchstoßlegende that it was inevitable that Germany would have made some sort of challenge to the international order created by the Treaty of Versailles, and the question of the "injustice" of the Treaty of Versailles was irrelevant as a challenge would have been made even if the Treaty of Versailles had been more favorable to Germany. The Dolchstoßlegende claimed that Germany had decisively defeated the combined forces of France, the British empire and the United States in 1918 and it was only at the moment of victory that Germany had been "stabbed-in-the-back" by the November revolution. Weinberg noted that pervasiveness of the Dolchstoßlegende was such that it explained the flippant way that Hitler declared war on the United States in 1941 with the full support of the Wehrmacht elite because it was genuinely believed by all of the German elites that Imperial Germany had crushed the United States in 1918, and that Nazi Germany would do the same. Weinberg noted that for German elites, not just Hitler, it was the alleged "stab-in-the-back" of 1918 that explained the German defeat, and it was taken for granted that the German military was invincible and could never be defeated provided the alleged "internal" enemies such as the Jews were dispatched first. The Polish historian Piotor Wandycz wrote that the real issue in interwar Germany was not how much the Treaty of Versailles adhered to the 14 Points, but rather the belief that Germany was supposedly "stabbed in the back" at the moment of victory, and that given this claim that Germany had actually won World War One that another war was inevitable. Even critics of the Treaty of Versailles such as Henry Kissinger wrote that for many Germans "having considered the pre-war world too confining, Germany was not likely to be satisfied with any terms available after a defeat".

Weinberg wrote the "harshness" of the Treaty of Versailles has been vastly exaggerated, noting that Germany lost far more land to Poland under the Oder-Neisse line, imposed in 1945, than the Reich had lost to Poland under the Treaty of Versailles, yet the Oder-Neisse line did not cause another war. In 1991, Germany signed a treaty with Poland under which the Oder-Neisse line was accepted as the permanent German-Polish frontier, despite the territorial losses being far greater than those imposed by the Treaty of Versailles. Weinberg also noted that the Allied leaders at the Paris peace conference of 1919 imposed the Minorities treaty on Poland, intended to protect the rights of Poland's Volksdeutsche (ethnic German) minority whereas, in 1945, all of the Germans living in the lands assigned to Poland were forcibly expelled from their homes forever, leading him to ask rhetorically if the Treaty of Versailles was really the monstrous "unjust" peace treaty that Germans had claimed it to be.

== Implementation ==
=== The Reunion of Alsace-Lorraine ===
Under the terms of the armistice of November 11, 1918, the French occupied Alsace–Lorraine. The French wasted no time in promptly proclaiming the reunion of Alsace-Lorraine with France. Many of the Alsatians had been unhappy under German rule, and the French troops who marched into Alsace-Lorraine in November 1918 were greeted as liberators with large crowds coming out to cheer the French soldiers while waving about tricolores. At the Paris peace conference, both Wilson and Lloyd George supported Clemenceau's demand for the reunion of Alsace-Lorraine with France. Under the terms of the Treaty of Versailles, Alsace-Lorraine was returned to France. Under the terms of the Treaty of Locarno in 1925, Germany accepted as permanent the Franco-German border established by the Treaty of Versailles and renounced its claim upon Alsace-Lorraine.

=== The Rhineland dispute ===
At the Paris peace conference in 1919, Clemenceau wanted to see the Rhineland severed from Germany. The Rhineland with its steep hills and the broad Rhine river formed a natural defensive barrier and Clemenceau insisted that France needed the Rhineland to have sécurité after the war. Ideally, Clemenceau wanted to see the Rhineland annexed to France, but was willing to accept having the Rhineland became a French puppet state under a permanent French military occupation. Marshal Ferdinand Foch, France's most respected and honored general, argued that the French needed control of the Rhineland in order to stand a chance of victory in another war with Germany, which Foch believed to be inevitable as the Allies had defeated, but not destroyed Germany as a great power. In Foch's viewpoint, France's need for sécurité took precedence over the rights of the Rhinelanders for self-determination. As the Rhineland was overwhelmingly German in population and its people did not wish to be severed from Germany, both Wilson and Lloyd George were completely opposed to Clemenceau's plans for the Rhineland, which they claimed would create "an Alsace-Lorraine in reverse" with the Rhinelanders being placed unhappily under French rule. Wilson in particular was strongly for the Rhineland remaining part of Germany and he threatened several times to have the American delegation walk out of the peace conference if Clemenceau persisted with his plans for the Rhineland.

Under strong Anglo-American pressure, the French were forced to accept that the Rhineland would remain part of the Reich. As a consolation prize, Clemenceau was offered a military alliance with the British empire and the United States, under which Anglo-American forces would come to France's aid in the event of German aggression. However, the British acceptance of the alliance was made conditional upon the American acceptance of the alliance, and the United States Senate voted against the alliance with France, thus rendering the proposed Anglo-American-French alliance null and void. Clemenceau and the other French leaders always felt that France had been "cheated" as the French made major concessions to the Anglo-American viewpoint in return for alliances that proved to be an illusion. Under the Treaty of Versailles, the Rhineland remained part of Germany, but was made into a permanent demilitarized zone and the French were allowed to occupy the Rhineland until 1935, through in fact the French occupation ended early in June 1930.

=== The Danzig dispute ===
One of the thorniest issues at the Paris peace conference was the status of Danzig (Gdańsk, Poland), annexed by Prussia during Partitions of Poland. Point 13 called for a reborn Polish state that would have "free and secure access to the sea". Danzig was a deep water port located where the Vistula river flows into the Baltic sea, making it the principal port where goods both came in and out of Poland. Roman Dmowski the chief of the Polish delegation, argued that allowing Danzig to remain with Germany would give the Reich economic control of Poland and that for Poland to be truly independent required that Danzig return to Poland. At the peace conference, Wilson explained that what he meant by Poland having "free and secure access to the sea" in point 13 was that Danzig should return to Poland. Clemenceau likewise supported the Polish claim to Danzig, but Lloyd George was stoutly opposed as he argued that it would be unjust to force a city whose population at the time was 90% German unwillingly into Poland. An impasse emerged at the Paris peace conference with Clemenceau and Wilson supporting the Polish claim to Danzig while Lloyd-George maintained that the city should remain within Germany. James Headlam-Morley of the British delegation came up with the compromise of making Danzig into a Free City that would belong to neither Poland nor Germany. The Treaty of Versailles imposed the compromise solution of severing Danzig from Germany to become the Free City of Danzig, a city-state in which Poland had certain special rights.

=== The Polish Corridor and Upper Silesia ===
German public opinion did not accept the loss of Danzig along with the loss of the so-called Polish Corridor and Upper Silesia to Poland, and for the entirety of the interwar period, it was common for Germans to speak of the "open wound in the East". The eastern borders the Treaty of Versailles imposed on Germany, especially the Polish Corridor, were universally viewed in Germany as "unjust" and a "national humiliation". The way that different peoples in Central Europe were mixed together in a patch-work of different pockets made it very difficult for the Allies to divide up the German-Polish border in a manner consistent with the principles of the 14 points as inevitably some people ended up being struck on the "wrong" side of the frontier. Before 1914, Germany had 1 million Poles living within its borders; after 1918 Poland had 1 million Germans living within its borders.

Before 1914, Central Europe had been dominated by the three great empires, namely the Austrian, Russian and German empires with the first two being supra-national states where the focal point in the state ideologies was loyalty to the ruling families, namely the House of Habsburg and the House of Romanov. The German-speaking element formed the dominant group in the Austrian empire while the way that the Russian empire defined loyalty to the House of Romanov as the main criterion had allowed the Volksdeutsche (ethnic Germans) under Russian rule to flourish. In Imperial Russia, a disproportionate number of the civil servants, policemen, diplomats and military officers were Baltic German noblemen to such an extent that in the 18th, 19th and early 20th centuries that many Russians complained that it was the Baltic German aristocracy who ruled them rather than vice versa.

Before 1914, there had been little concern in Germany over the status of the German populations of Eastern Europe as ethnic Germans were the dominant element in the Austrian empire and to a large extent in the Russian empire as well. In the interwar period, ethnic Germans were no longer the dominant element in Eastern Europe, and their status became a matter of considerable concern in Germany as it was often noted there were about between 10 and 12 million Volksdeutsche living in Central Europe where other peoples were now the dominant elements. The German historian Detlev Peukert argued that the way that different peoples were mixed together in Central Europe into a patchwork with no straight lines between them made the principle of national self-determination very difficult to apply.

Peukert used Upper Silesia, an ethically mixed region inhabited by Germans and Poles that was a center of coal mining and heavy industry as an example of how "...these problems could not be fundamentally resolved if national self-determination were to be the sole criterion to be applied". Initially, at the Paris peace conference, it was planned to have Poland annex all of Upper Silesia, but it decided instead to hold a referendum to decide the issue with Upper Silesia to be partitioned with the areas voting for Germany to stay within the Reich while the areas voting for Poland to be returned to Poland. When the referendum was held in March 1921, 68% of the people of the people of Upper Silesia voted to stay in Germany while 32% voted to go to Poland, but the attempt by the Allied commissioners to draw up a frontier that was mutually acceptable to both sides proved impossible.

Despite their best efforts of the Allied commissioners inevitably some Poles and Germans ended being on the "wrong" side of the frontier as there were no straight lines between the Polish and German inhabited areas in Upper Silesia. This was especially the case because in many of the contested districts of Upper Silesia, the people in the urban areas tended to vote for staying in Germany while the rural areas voted for going to Poland. On May 3, 1921, fierce fighting broke out between German and Polish para-military groups who were both determined to seize as much of Upper Silesia as possible for their respective nations. Ultimately, in June 1921 the Allies imposed a frontier in Upper Silesia that left both the Poles and Germans complaining was "unjust" to their respective nations.

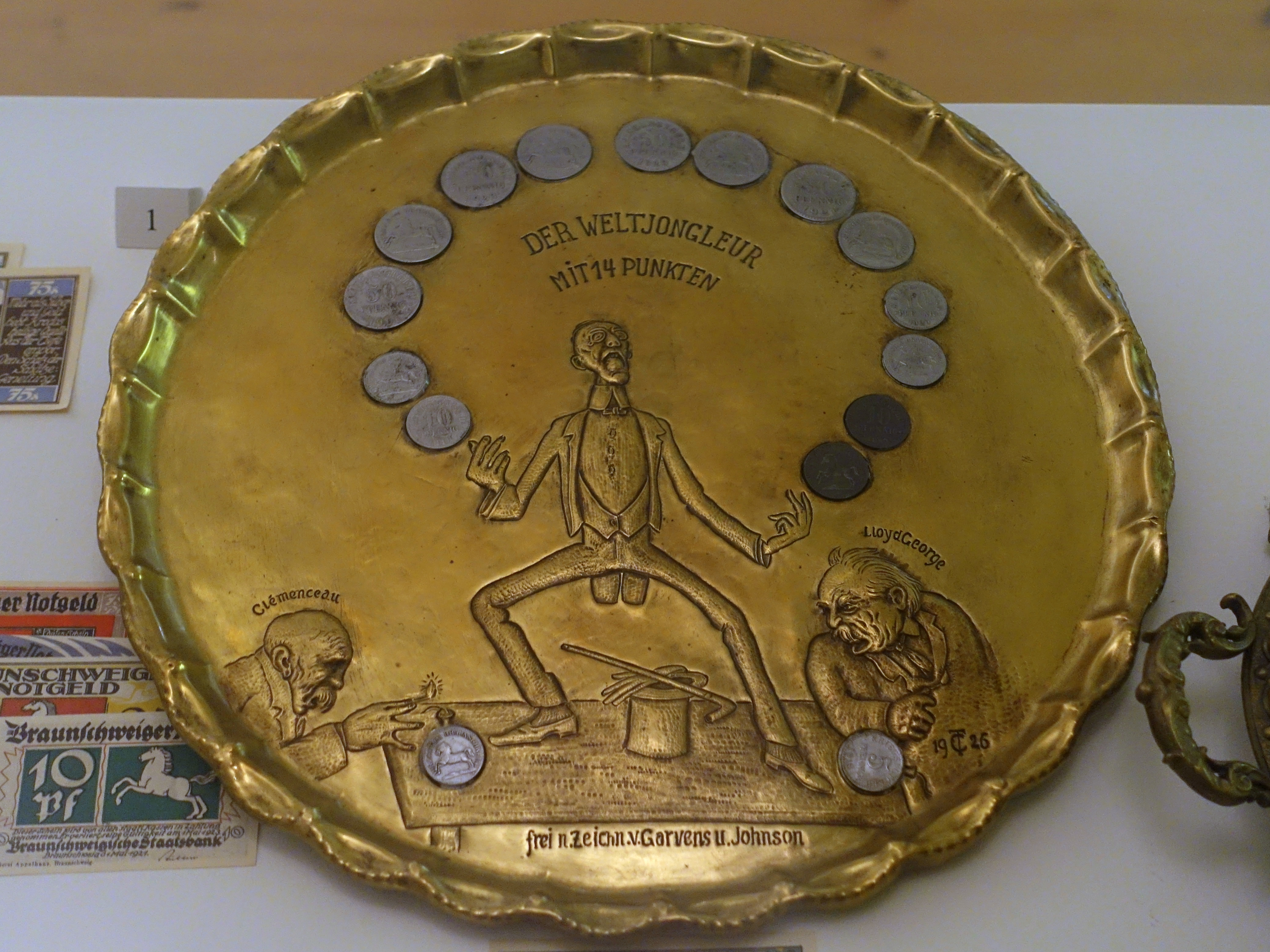
1926 German artwork made with Notgeld coins depicting "The World-Juggler with 14 Points;" Clemenceau and Lloyd George light bombs.

In 1925, Germany signed the Treaty of Locarno under which the Reich accepted its western borders as laid down by the Treaty of Versailles, meaning that Germany renounced any claim to Alsace-Lorraine and the Eupen-Malmedy district of Belgium. Likewise under the Locarno treaties, Germany voluntarily accepted the permanent demilitarized status of the Rhineland as imposed by the Treaty of Versailles. In a memo sent out to all German embassies around the world on October 28, 1925, written by the State Secretary, Carl von Schubert, it was announced that German public opinion could accept the loss of Alsace-Lorraine to France, hence the Treaty of Locarno, but could never accept the loss of any of the former German lands to Poland. As such, the memo stated that there would never be an "Eastern Locarno" under which the Reich would accept the current German-Polish frontier.

However, the memo went on to downplay the acceptance of the loss of Alsace-Lorraine under the Treaty of Locarno as it was argued that 14 Points had made the principle of national self-determination a key point of "modern diplomacy" and that the German Foreign Minister Gustav Stresemann believed agitation to "go home to the Reich" in Alsace-Lorraine would ultimately force the French to return the region to Germany. The memo stated that the entire purpose of the Treaty of Locarno was to clear the way for Germany to take back by force if necessary all of the lands lost to Poland as it was stated that the only reason why Stresemann wanted better relations with France was to persuade the French to renounce the alliance they had signed with Poland in 1921, and in this way create a situation where Germany could invade Poland without fear of causing a war with France.

=== Ukraine ===
At the time, Ukrainian delegations failed to receive any support from France and UK. Although some agreements were reached, neither of the states provided any actual support as in general their agenda was to restore Poland and unified anti-Bolshevik Russia. Thus, Ukrainian representatives Arnold Margolin and Teofil Okunevsky had high hopes for American mission, but in the end found it even more categorical than the French and British ones:

This meeting, which took place on June 30, made a tremendous impression on both Okunevsky and me. Lansing showed complete ignorance of the situation and blind faith in Kolchak and Denikin. He categorically insisted that the Ukrainian government recognise Kolchak as the supreme ruler and leader of all anti-Bolshevik armies. When it came to the Wilson principles, the application of which was predetermined in relation to the peoples of the former Austro-Hungarian monarchy, Lansing said that he knew only about the single Russian people and that the only way to restore Russia was a federation modeled on the United States. When I tried to prove to him that the example of the United States testifies to the need for the preliminary existence of separate states as subjects for any possible agreements between them in the future, he evaded answering and began again stubbornly urging us to recognise Kolchak. [...] That's how in reality these principles were implemented. USA supported Kolchak, England – Denikin and Yudenich, France – Galler... Only Petliura was left without any support.

— Arnold Margolin, Ukraine and Policy of the Entente (Notes of Jew and Citizen)

=== The Russian Civil War ===
During the Russian Civil War, the Allies supported the White cause with varying degrees of enthusiasm. The country that supported the White cause the most was Great Britain, which supplied by far the largest number of arms to the White armies with the British supplying the Whites with 600,000 rifles, 6,831 machine guns, and about 200,000 uniforms between October 1918 and October 1919. As such, the Allies had considerable leverage over the Whites, and forced Admiral Alexander Kolchak, the "Supreme Leader" of the Whites to accept a number of conditions in return for military aid. The American historian Richard Pipes noted that many of the Allied conditions were more properly internal Russian matters such as forcing Kolchak to agree in advance that there would be no restoration of the monarchy in Russia after the expected White victory. Amongst the conditions imposed on Admiral Kolchak were promises to accept the independence of Poland and Finland from Russia and to accept the mediation of the Allies concerning future Russian relations with the Baltic states and the Caucasian states. In a telegram to Paris sent on June 4, 1919, Kolchak accepted every condition except for the independence of Finland, which he accepted only de facto, not de jure, saying he wanted the Constituent Assembly of Russia to grant Finland its independence.

=== The Adriatic question ===
Italy had been allied to Germany and the Austro-Hungarian monarchy in the so-called Triple Alliance. However, in August 1914 Italy declared itself neutral. On April 26, 1915, under the terms of the secret Treaty of London, Italy was promised by Britain, France, and Russia substantial parts of the Austrian empire plus Albania, the area around Antalya in Asia Minor, Jubaland (modern southern Somalia), and a small part of Egypt as a reward for declaring war on the Austro-Hungarian monarchy. On May 22, 1915, Italy declared war on the Austrian empire. The Treaty of London entered the public domain when it was published in Petrograd by the Narkomindel in December 1917. In January 1919, Wilson visited Rome just before the peace conference opened, and met the Italian leaders. The Italian Foreign Minister, Sidney Sonnino, wrote that he was "disgusted" by Wilson's principles of national self-determination as he preferred the traditional elitist power politics of European diplomacy.

The Italian prime minister Orlando went to the Paris peace conference under the slogan "the Treaty of London plus Fiume". At the peace conference, Wilson supported the Italian claim based on the Treaty of London to have the Brenner pass as the new Italian-Austrian frontier and to add the South Tyrol province of Austria to Italy. However, South Tyrol had a German majority, and Wilson was later to say that it was a mistake on his part to support the Italian claim to South Tyrol, saying that he did not know in 1919 that the majority of the people in South Tyrol spoke German. Wilson opposed to the Italian demands for all of the Istria and Dalmatia provinces of the former Austrian empire under the grounds that many of the peoples living in the lands being claimed were not Italian and did not wish to be under Italian rule. In particular, Wilson was opposed to all of Dalmatia going to Italy despite what the Treaty of London had promised under the grounds that the majority of the people in Dalmatia were Croats who wished to join Yugoslavia. By contrast, Sonnino argued to Wilson that because Italy had lost half million killed in the war that he felt that there was a moral obligation for the Treaty of London to be fulfilled to the letter and that all of the lands promised to Italy should be Italian, regardless of what the people living in those lands might feel. Wilson supported the Italian claims to the Dalmatian cities of Zara (modern Zadar, Croatia) and Sebenico (modern Šibenik, Croatia) because the majority of the people in those cities were Italian, but was opposed to rest of Dalmatia going to Italy. However, Wilson had less concern for Turks as opposed to Croats and Slovenes and suggested several times he supported "compensation" for Italy where in exchange for an Italian renunciation of the claim to Dalmatia that Italy could have a much larger occupation zone in Asia Minor.

Sonnino's argument that Italy's war losses entitled Italy to have all of the terms of the Treaty of London fulfilled was a popular one in Italy. By contrast, Wilson became an unpopular figure in Italy. Italian newspaper cartoons depicted Wilson dressed in an Austrian uniform and sanctimoniously denying the Italian claims to Dalmatia and Fiume under the grounds of self-determination. The American embassy in Rome required a special police guard owing to Wilson's unpopularity in Italy. In particular, Wilson was opposed to the Italian demand for Fiume (modern Rijeka, Croatia), a city which Orlando was determined to see annexed to Italy. In Italy in the interwar period, it was common to speak of the vittoria mutilata ("mutilated victory") as it was argued that Italy was entitled to all of the lands promised by the Treaty of London, and that Italy had been humiliated by Wilson. In the end, almost all of Dalmatia ended up being assigned to Yugoslavia. Italy gained Zara in 1920 under the Treaty of Rapallo and Fiume under the Treaty of Rome in 1924. During the interwar period, the Fascist Party under the leadership of Benito Mussolini used the vittoria mutilata thesis to paint the entire Italian political class as pusillanimous politicians who allowed Wilson to deny Italy its rightful share of the spoils of war. Italian foreign policy oscillated between a desire to uphold an international order under which Italy had made gains and a desire to undermine it in order to make further gains. During the Fascist era, many of the professional Italian diplomats thought it was dangerous on the part of Mussolini to challenge the international order created by the Treaty of Versailles as it felt that such a campaign would give Germany a strong moral basis for claiming South Tyrol and that Italy had more to gain by working with Britain and France than with Germany.

=== The Armenia mandate ===
During the Paris peace conference, Wilson explored the idea of Ottoman Armenia being turned into a League of Nations mandate with the United States as the administrating power. Wilson felt that the way that the Armenian community of Asia Minor had been devastated with the survivors of the genocide living in destitution that Armenia could not stand as an independent state for the foreseeable future. The way that the Sublime Porte had quite consciously targeted the better educated Armenians for extermination as a way to deprive the Armenians of any sort of leadership that might challenge the Ottoman Empire posed additional problems for creating an Armenian state. Accordingly, Wilson felt that Armenia would require a period of American rule to help the survivors rebuild their shattered communities for least a decade, if not longer. The plans for an American mandate for Armenia ended in fiasco on June 1, 1920, when the president's request for an American mandate was rejected by the Senate with 52 senators voting nay and 23 senators voting yea.

The Allied plans for Asia Minor proved to be stillborn as Anatolia was regarded by the Turks as the Turkish heartland and the Turks were not willing to accept the Allied plans to partition Asia Minor. The Ottoman Army had been defeated, but not destroyed by the Allies in 1918, an aspect of the situation that the Allies had failed to consider when they drew up their plans for the partition of Anatolia. In 1919, a war broke out with Greece as the Turks under the leadership of their future president, General Mustafa Kemal, chose to resist by force the Greek plans to annex parts of Asia Minor. Following the Turkish victory over Greece in 1922, the final stage of the "homogenization" of Asia Minor was achieved with the Greek-Turkish compulsory population exchange of 1922–1923 that saw one million Greeks expelled from Anatolia into Greece while 500,000 Turks were expelled from Greece into Turkey. The population exchange was carried out amid scenes of horrific suffering on both sides as vast numbers of people were uprooted by force from their homes to be expelled into their "homelands" that neither side knew. The British historian Evan Easton-Calabria noted that the Greek-Turkish compulsory population exchange was the final rejection of Wilson's vision outlined in the 14 points of the different peoples of Asia Minor co-existing together, and instead marked the triumph of the "homogenization" viewpoint.

=== March First Movement ===
The promise of national self-determination in the 14 Points led to hopes in Korea that Wilson would pressure the Japanese to restore independence to Korea, which had been annexed to Japan in 1910. On March 1, 1919, a group of Korean nationalists issued a declaration of independence and appealed to the "Big Three" leaders at the Paris peace conference for support. The declaration set off what the Koreans call the Samil Undong (March 1st Movement) as over 1 million Koreans took part in demonstrations in March 1919 demanding that Korean independence be restored. The Japanese crushed the demonstrations via brutal methods as the unarmed protestors were shot down in the streets. Wilson, Clemenceau and Lloyd George all refused the Korean appeals for help, and took the viewpoint that events in Korea were an internal Japanese matter that did not concern them. The sense of betrayal occasioned by the indifference of the "Big Three" leaders in Paris to the crushing of the March 1st movement led to some Korean nationalists to look towards Soviet Russia as an ally and played an important role in the founding of the Korean Communist Party.

=== The Revolution of 1919 ===
Likewise, the promise of national self-determination in the 14 points led to a group of Egyptian politicians led by Saad Zaghloul, to decide to go to the Paris peace conference to ask Wilson and Clemenceau to pressure Lloyd George to end the British occupation of Egypt, which had begun in 1882. But on March 8, 1919, Zaghloul and his group were arrested by the British military police and deported to Malta as "trouble-makers". The arrests set off what Egyptians call the Revolution of 1919 as a series of massive demonstrations broke out all over Egypt with the demands being made that Egypt's independence be restored and all British forces should leave Egypt immediately. The Revolution of 1919 did not force the British to leave, but was a seminal moment in the emergence of a sense of Egyptian nationalism. In 1922, in an attempt to end the protests, the British granted independence to Egypt, but continued the occupation.

=== The Shandong question ===
One of the most vexatious issues at the Paris peace conference was the "Shandong question". In 1897 Germany had invaded and occupied the Shandong (Shantung) province in China, and forced the Qing empire to sign a treaty giving the Reich a 99-year lease on Shandong. Qingdao (Tsingtao), the capital of Shandong, became the principal German naval base in Asia. In August 1914, Japan entered the war on the Allied side, invaded Shandong, and by November 1914 were in complete control of the province after the fall of Qingdao. On May 25, 1915, following a Japanese ultimatum threatening war, a Sino-Japanese treaty was signed under which it was agreed that the Japanese would take over all of the former German rights in Shandong after the end of the war. In 1917, China declared war on Germany. That same year, Britain, France, and Italy all signed secret treaties promising to support the Japanese claim on Shandong after the war.

At the Paris peace conference, it was the aim of the Japanese delegation to have Japan confirmed as the ruler of Shandong while the Chinese delegation sought to have Shandong returned to China. On January 27, 1919, Makino Nobuaki of the Japanese delegation laid out the Japanese claim, which was based partly upon right of conquest and partly on the Sino-Japanese treaty of 1915. On January 29, 1919, a young Chinese diplomat Wellington Koo gave the Chinese case for Shandong. Intelligent, charming, and fluent in both French and English, Koo became one of the "stars" of the peace conference. Koo began his argument with the statement that under international law treaties signed under the threat of violence are invalid. Koo argued that the Sino-Japanese treaty of 1915 was invalid as Japan was threatening war unless China gave its assent. Likewise, Koo argued that the original Sino-German treaty of 1897 was also invalid for the same reason. Koo made much use of the 14 points as he argued that the right of national self-determination meant Shandong should go to China because its people were overwhelmingly Han and wanted to return to China. Koo also used the 14 points to argue that the secret treaties under which Italy, France and Britain agreed to support the Japanese claims were invalid as all these treaties violated point one with its call for open diplomacy.

Much to Koo's disappointment, on April 22, 1919, Wilson came out in support of the Japanese claim to Shandong as he stated "the war had been fought largely for the purpose of showing that treaties cannot be violated" and it was "better to live up to a bad treaty than tear it up" as he argued that China was bound by the 1915 treaty. On May 4, 1919, it was announced that Shandong would go to Japan, sparking the May 4th movement, which is often regarded as the beginning of modern China. Starting on 4 May, thousands of Chinese university students marched in protest against the award of Shandong. The sense that China was being bullied because it was weak and backward led many of the students to embark on ventures meant to reform and modernize China. China refused to sign the Treaty of Versailles to protest against the award of Shandong to Japan.

In an interview conducted in June 1969 to mark the 50th anniversary of the Treaty of Versailles, Koo remarked that the Paris peace conference, which launched the May 4th movement, changed Chinese views of the West as he observed that many Chinese intellectuals believed the victorious powers of 1918 would allow China to be treated as an equal. Koo stated that the award of Shandong to Japan had turned public opinion against the Western powers. Koo stated: "Looking back at China's stand at the Paris peace conference and the developments preceding, it appears that these events are...a turning point in China's history, both from the domestic and international point of view...One could wonder what would be the situation in China [today] either if China had succeeded in settling the Shandong question in Paris to her satisfaction or if she had signed the treaty without the reservation. These are questions which probably can never be fully answered now". Koo noted that the new regime of Soviet Russia, which denounced liberalism as a device for Western imperialism and renounced almost all of the special Russian rights in China gained under Tsarism, won tremendous prestige in China as the one power seemingly willing to treat China as an equal, which led directly to the founding of the Chinese Communist Party in 1920.
