= Joe Cury =

American activist (1928–1977)

Joseph H. Cury (born November 6, 1928, in Allentown, Pennsylvania – January 11, 1977) was the owner of the Mandarin Super Market and a resident of Mandarin, Florida. He was known as the founder of POWER, an advocacy group on utility rates, and as an opponent of the Dames Point Bridge and nuclear power plants.

== Founding of POWER ==
Cury received an electrical bill from the Jacksonville Electric Authority (JEA) which was double the cost of the month before. He called the company to inquire and they said it was because of the high cost of oil. Cury then founded People Outraged With Electric Rates (POWER), a local advocacy group. The treasurer was Harry Shorstein, former State Attorney for the city of Jacksonville, Florida. Ralph Nader became involved with the protests for a short time. Inspired by Nader's brief involvement, Cury changed P.O.W.E.R. to Consumer P.O.W.E.R.

Cury strongly opposed the construction of the Dames Point Bridge, and was a vocal leader of the opposition to the project. He was also opposed to the movement to bring an Offshore Power Systems (O.P.S.) assembly facility to the Jacksonville area. In 1975, Cury considered running for mayor of Jacksonville and realizing that he would have to borrow too much money, he considered city council instead. He received a letter threatening to reveal his conspiracy to robbery conviction from Pennsylvania. Cury had been convicted of the attempted theft of $1200.00 (the equivalent of approximately $13,000 with inflation) and reported the letter to the authorities, where it was found to contain only the fingerprints of Cury and the investigating officer. Cury was also part of the opposition of the Dames Point Bridge movement. His main opposition in this project was Wesley Paxson, the chairman of the Jacksonville Transportation Authority (JTA). He was also opposed by George Truett Ewton, the chairman of the JEA. At his store, he sold a copy of Ralph Nader's newsletter, Critical Mass.

== Opposing nuclear power plants ==
Cury opposed the Offshore Power Systems (OPS) project, a 1970 joint venture between Westinghouse Electric Company, which constructed nuclear generating plants, and Newport News Shipbuilding and Drydock, which had recently merged with Tenneco, to create floating nuclear power plants at Jacksonville, Florida. Opposition to the project was both local and national because many people questioned the safety of nuclear power.

OPS ultimately was not successful due to the 1973 oil crisis. By the end of the embargo in March 1974, the price of oil had risen nearly 300%, from US$3 per barrel to nearly $12 globally; US prices were significantly higher. The embargo caused an oil crisis, or "shock", with many short- and long-term effects on global politics and the global economy. Less oil available resulted in higher oil prices, which encouraged conservation and less demand for electricity. PSE&G did not need the additional capacity from the nuclear generators they had ordered, so PSE&G requested a two-year delay, culminating in a canceled contract. Cury became known to the community through his public interest work and was frequently in the local press. After his death, the local Southside Business Men's Club awarded him their Outspoken Citizens Award.

== Death ==
He died from heart disease in 1977 at age 48.

== Personal life ==
Joseph and his wife Betty had two children, Charles (deceased) and Pamela.
