= Florida National Bank =

- Edward Ball Building, formerly the Florida National Bank Building
- Type: Banking
- Predecessor: Mercantile Exchange Bank
- Founded: 1905
- Founder: Samuel Hubbard
- Defunct: 1990
- Fate: Acquired by First Union
- Successor: Wells Fargo (through Wachovia and First Union)
- Headquarters: Jacksonville, Florida

Florida National Bank (FNB), founded in 1905, was the second largest commercial bank in Florida. Florida National Group was acquired in 1990 by First Union Corporation, which was renamed Wachovia in 2001; Wachovia was subsequently acquired by Wells Fargo in 2008.

== History ==
=== Early years ===
Samuel Hubbard's Mercantile Exchange Bank eventually became Florida National Bank after Jacksonville's Great Fire of 1901. Millionaire Alfred I. du Pont acquired a significant interest in the FNB shortly after moving to Jacksonville in the mid-1920s. Still, he was unable to gain control until the Great Depression struck in 1929. The FNB stayed solvent throughout the 1930s because du Pont put $15 million of his own money into the institution to cover Bank runs. During the early 1930s, six other Florida National Banks were opened throughout Florida, including Lakeland and Bartow; Alfred's wife, Jessie Ball du Pont was named a director of the bank. When Alfred du Pont died in 1935, the du Pont Trust, managed by Ed Ball, Jessie du Pont's brother, continued to control the bank. Growth continued with the acquisition of many more Florida banks over the next two decades and became known as the Florida National Group, which was one of the strongest banks in the state. In size, the branches eventually numbered 185, second only in Florida to Barnett Bank.

Ball built the Florida National Bank building at 214 North Hogan Street in Jacksonville in 1961. The structure was constructed using materials that would appreciate, such as marble floors and granite exteriors, but excluded items that Ball considered frills. There were no executive washrooms and no hot water faucets in the entire eleven story edifice. The corporate offices of the group were housed in the upper floors and the bank's principal location was on the ground floor. Ed Ball also kept his office there for managing the du Pont Trust. After Ball's death, the structure was renamed the Edward Ball Building.

Congress forced the du Pont Trust to divest itself of banking interests when it withdrew the trust's 15-year exemption from the Bank Holding Company Act of 1956. The trust sold 34.7% ownership in Florida National Banks to Charter Company in 1971 for $42M, leaving the du Pont Trust with 24.9%, below the legal definition of a bank holding company. The CEO of Charter was Raymond Mason, a protégé of Ed Ball. Additionally, Ed Ball personally owned 6.4% of FNB and was executor of his sister's estate, which owned 4.5% of FNB.

On July 9, 1973, the Federal Reserve Board issued a preliminary determination that the du Pont Trust had retained enough stock that would allow the trust to continue to exert some control over the bank. Ball was forced to sell the trust's remaining shares and resign as chairman of FNB. However, the du Pont Trust owned a significant block of Charter stock, and the close personal relationship between Mason and Ball still allowed some indirect control.

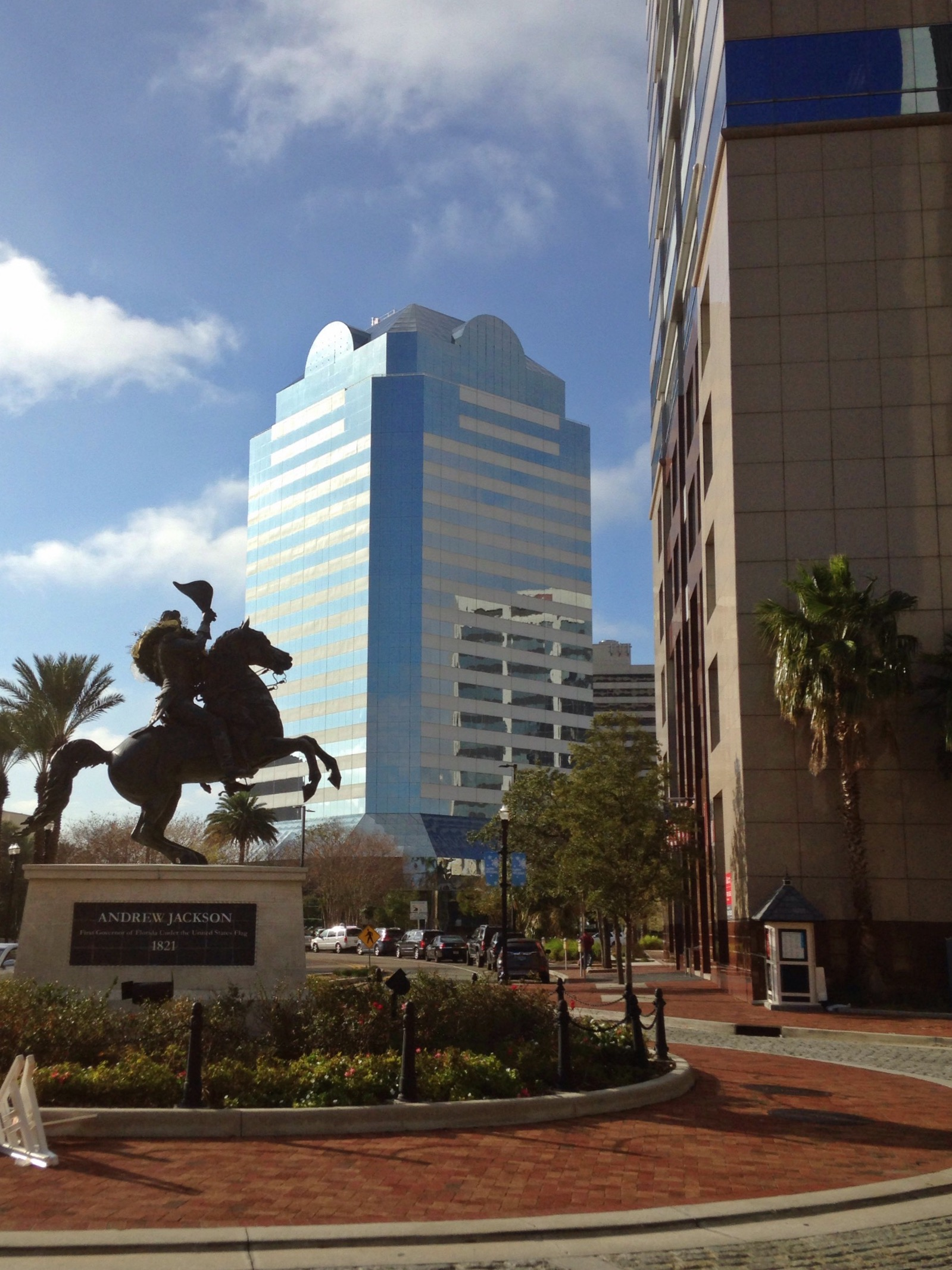
One Enterprise Center served as corporate headquarters of Florida National Bank from 1986 to 1990.

=== Acquisition ===
Miami-based Southeast Banking Corporation (SBC), Florida's largest bank holding company, targeted FNB with a takeover bid in 1980, which the FNB board rejected. That same year, a group of foreign investors from Chile, Venezuela, Canada, and South Florida sought 40% ownership and control of FNB. FNB filed suit in circuit court and the group was enjoined from acquiring more than 25% of the bank holding company's outstanding shares. However, Florida National revealed in 1981 that it was willing to permit acquisition by Chemical Banking Corporation of New York City after laws preventing interstate banking were lifted. At the same time, C.A. Cavendes Sociedad Financiera, a Venezuelan investment company, announced that it had acquired 24.99 percent of the common stock of Florida National.

In February 1982, SBC sued to obtain an injunction against the merger in Federal court, citing contrary banking laws in both Federal and Florida codes. Florida National Bank countered with an antitrust suit against SBC. FNB contended that if SBC were allowed to complete the takeover, commercial banking competition would be unlawfully reduced.

In early 1983, Southeast Banking Corporation dropped its takeover attempt and agreed to exchange their 1.73 million FNB shares for 24 FNB branch offices, $5.7M in cash, a downtown Miami real estate parcel and other assets. This was when Charter was going through a bankruptcy. The Federal Reserve Board approved a revised merger plan between FNB and Chemical Bank in 1984. However, at the time, interstate banking acquisitions were prohibited by Federal law and required state legislative approval. With the 1990 deadline running out for its option to buy FNB and no sign of state legislative approval, Chemical Bank sold their 4.9% interest to First Union Corporation of Charlotte, North Carolina for $115 million. On March 7, 1989, it was revealed First Union would acquire the remainder of FNB. The transaction, valued at $849 million, was consummated the following year.

== Building Ownership/Use ==
Wachovia sold the Florida National Bank building at 214 North Hogan Street to First States Investors in September, 2004 for $23,234,071.

The St. James Building became Jacksonville's City Hall in 1997, but it was too small to accommodate all departments. Needing more room, the City of Jacksonville purchased the building from First States Investors in February, 2006 for $23 million. Less than two blocks from city hall, it was designated the City Hall Annex. The Building & Planning department relocated there. After a $1.3 million, 2012 renovation, additional city departments moved into the upper floors. Ground floor building tenants include a VyStar Credit Union, Quiznos and a coffee shop.

== See also ==
- Jacksonville Bank, based in the same city
