= Your Dream Home =

Your Dream Home: how to build it for less than $3,500
- Author: Hubbard Cobb
- Language: English
- Genre: non-fiction
- Published: 1950 (Wm. H. Wise & Co.)
- Publication place: United States
- Pages: 576

Your Dream Home: How to Build It for Less Than $3,500 is a 1950 "do it yourself" book by American columnist and editor Hubbard Cobb. It was the biggest non-fiction seller of the year of its release, selling over a million copies. Specifically, the book featured instructions for building a Cape Cod style home, with eight floor plans included. The book is illustrated and covers all aspects of construction relevant to 1950, from financing the project and clearing the land to constructing built-in furniture for the finished product. It was the debut book for Cobb, who would go on to produce a number of others in the "do it yourself" genre.
