= Zeke Zechella =

- Born: August 11, 1920; Newport, Kentucky
- Died: August 15, 2009 (aged 89); Ponte Vedra Beach, Florida
- Education: United States Naval Academy; Rensselaer Polytechnic Institute
- Alma mater: United States Naval Academy
- Occupations: Naval officer, engineer, corporate president
- Spouse: Jean Millicent Bary
- Children: Bary Alexander, Pamela Lynn, Amy Louise
- Parent(s): Nicholas & Cecelia Rizzi Zechella

Alexander Philip "Zeke" Zechella (August 11, 1920 – August 15, 2009) was a United States Navy veteran and pioneer in the usage of nuclear energy who headed several major companies before retiring in Jacksonville, Florida, and assisting local non-profit agencies.

== Early years ==
His parents, Nicholas and Cecelia Rizzi Zechella, were Italian immigrants who settled in Newport, Kentucky, where he was born. He excelled at both academics and athletics and graduated from Newport High School in 1938 as class president. He wanted to become a doctor and received a football scholarship to the University of Kentucky. During his first year there, he realized he could not pay for medical school, so he secured an appointment to the United States Naval Academy. While at Annapolis, Zechella married his longtime sweetheart, Jean Millicent Bary, on June 24, 1942. He played football and graduated in 1943, was commissioned an ensign and served on destroyers in both the Atlantic and Pacific Theaters during World War II. His first assignment was assistant engineering officer on the USS Greer (DD-145). His son Bary Alexander was born in 1944. When the war ended, he was executive officer of the USS Ringgold (DD-500).

He remained in the Navy and earned a master's degree in civil engineering at Rensselaer Polytechnic Institute in 1948. His first daughter, Pamela Lynn, was born when the family was stationed in Long Beach, California. Zechella utilized his engineering knowledge while he was in charge of construction projects at Navy bases in Alaska, then served with the Seabees during the Korean War.

== Business ==
=== Westinghouse ===
Lieutenant Commander Zechella resigned his commission and left the Navy in 1953. He was hired by Westinghouse Electric Company, working at the Bettis Atomic Power Laboratory in Pennsylvania. He worked as a design engineer on the USS Nautilus, the world's first nuclear-powered submarine, then was instrumental in the building of the USS Enterprise, the world's first nuclear-powered aircraft carrier. For the Enterprise, he was responsible for building the prototype engineering plant, then installed the ship's eight nuclear reactors. His youngest child, Amy Louise, was born during this period. He was appointed general manager of the Westinghouse Astronuclear Laboratory in 1969. The lab was founded in the late 1950s to develop nuclear space propulsion technology for the government.

=== OPS ===
Zechella began serving as president of Offshore Power Systems (OPS) in 1972 when plant construction began. OPS was a 1970 joint venture between Westinghouse and Newport News Shipbuilding and Drydock, who had recently merged with Tenneco. Their goal was to build floating nuclear power plants from a facility at Jacksonville, Florida. The completed plants were to be towed by ocean tugboats to their permanent locations, then anchored and protected by a massive concrete breakwater composed of 18,000 dolosses, each weighing 80 tons, designed to withstand hurricanes, tornadoes, moderate earthquakes and collision by a loaded tanker. However, outside forces seemed to conspire against it. A combination of nuclear regulations and no license, questions about the safety of nuclear power, the 1973 oil crisis, the 1973–75 recession and escalating costs caused the failure of the endeavor. A frustrated Zechella left OPS and retired as a Westinghouse vice president in 1980 after 27 years at the company. Offshore Power Systems finally shut down in 1984.

=== Charter ===
In 1980, Zechella was hired by the Charter Company, a Jacksonville conglomerate and Fortune 500 company. When four senior Charter executives were killed in a helicopter crash in 1982, Zechella became company president and CEO, but retired at age 65 in 1985.

== Retirement ==
Zechella was a golf enthusiast and a founding member of the Tournament Players Club; he served many years on the TPC Charities board. He pushed for the building of the Nancy Reagan TPC Village, a facility to provide substance-abuse treatment for teenagers, then served as board chairman for several years. He was a partner in the Environmental Recovery Group at Mayport, a trustee of Jacksonville University, and helped found the St. Vincent's Foundation of St. Vincent's Hospital in Jacksonville. He also served on the board of the National Conference of Christians and Jews (now known as the National Conference for Community and Justice).

In his final years, he suffered from Parkinson's disease and died at age 89.
