= Downe Communications =

American publishing company

Downe Communications was a publishing company founded by Edward Downe, Jr. that produced several popular magazines and provided subscription fulfillment services from 1967 to 1978.

Downe was a trained journalist who worked at newspapers before becoming a magazine editor. In 1966, Downe purchased Family Magazine, a newspaper insert similar to Parade Magazine. He founded Downe Communications the following year. The company acquired the Ladies' Home Journal and The American Home in 1968 from Curtis Publishing Company for $5.4 million in stock. Argosy magazine was purchased that same year. Downe also briefly owned the Swiss watch company Jules Jürgensen between 1968-1974.

Look magazine ceased publication in 1971. Two months prior, the circulation department had completed the development of its new computer system that stored the names and addresses of customers on magnetic tape. This new fulfillment system gave rise to the idea for a new business, with six Look employees looking for their first client. Publisher Edward Downe, Jr. agreed to not only be the company’s first client, but also its owner – if the company was named after him. Thus, on April 1, 1972, Downe Computer Services opened with 172 employees and one client.

In 1977, the Charter Company in Jacksonville, Florida, started buying Downe Communications’ stock. Downe sold his controlling interest in the company to Charter for approximately $9 million in 1978. The company name was changed to Charter Data Services (CDS); today, it is known as CDS Global.
