= Offshore Power Systems =

Defunct American developer of floating nuclear power stations

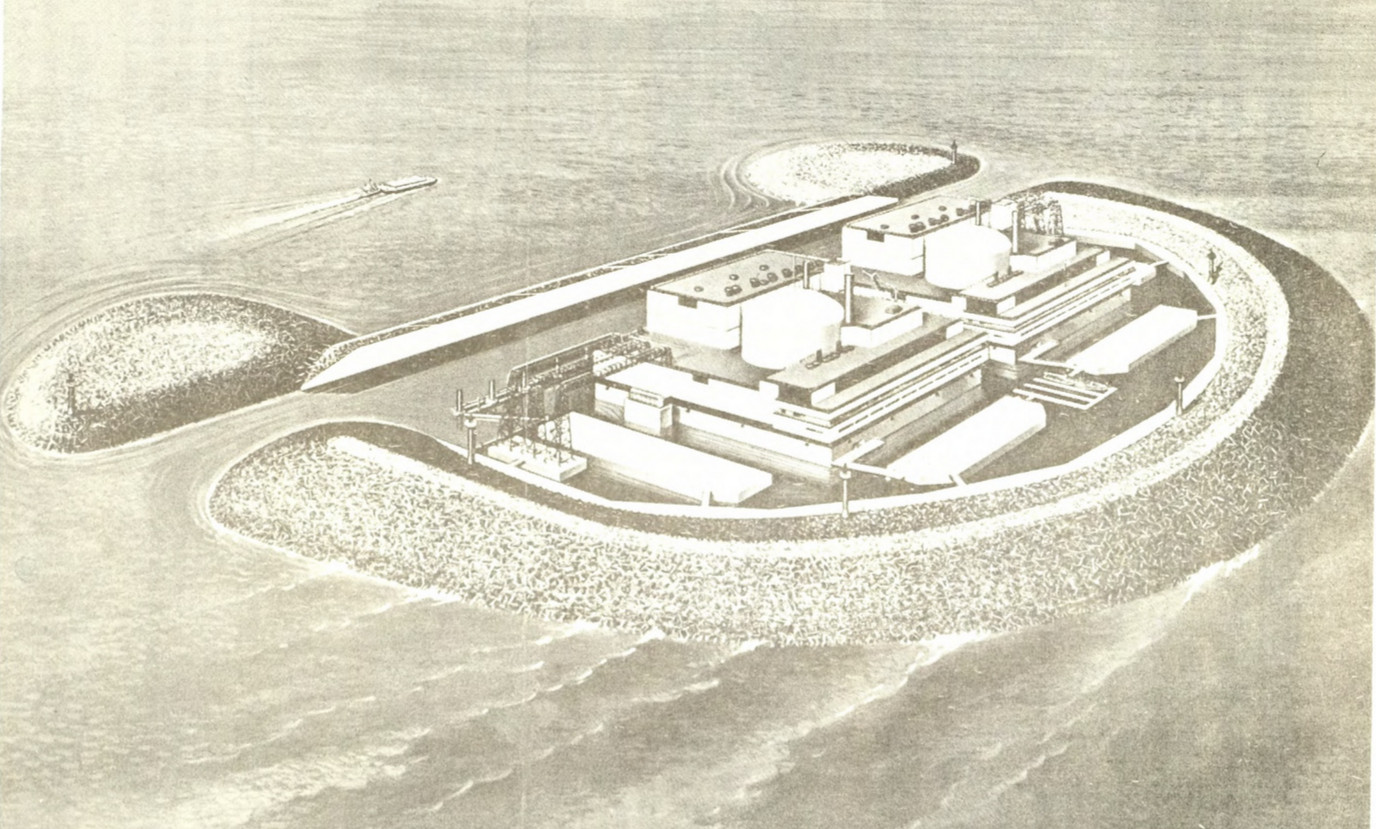
An artist's concept of two Offshore Power Systems floating nuclear reactors

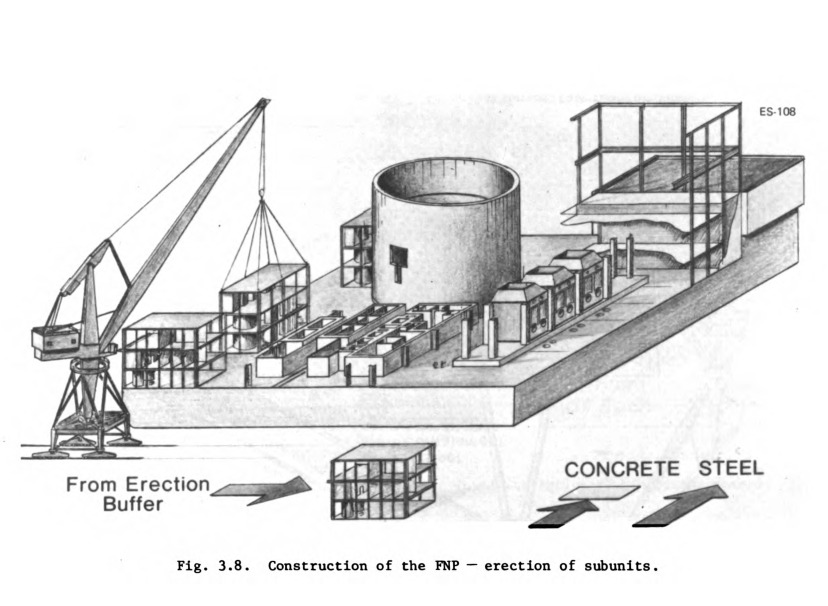
A floating nuclear power plant from Offshore Power Systems being constructed in a shipyard

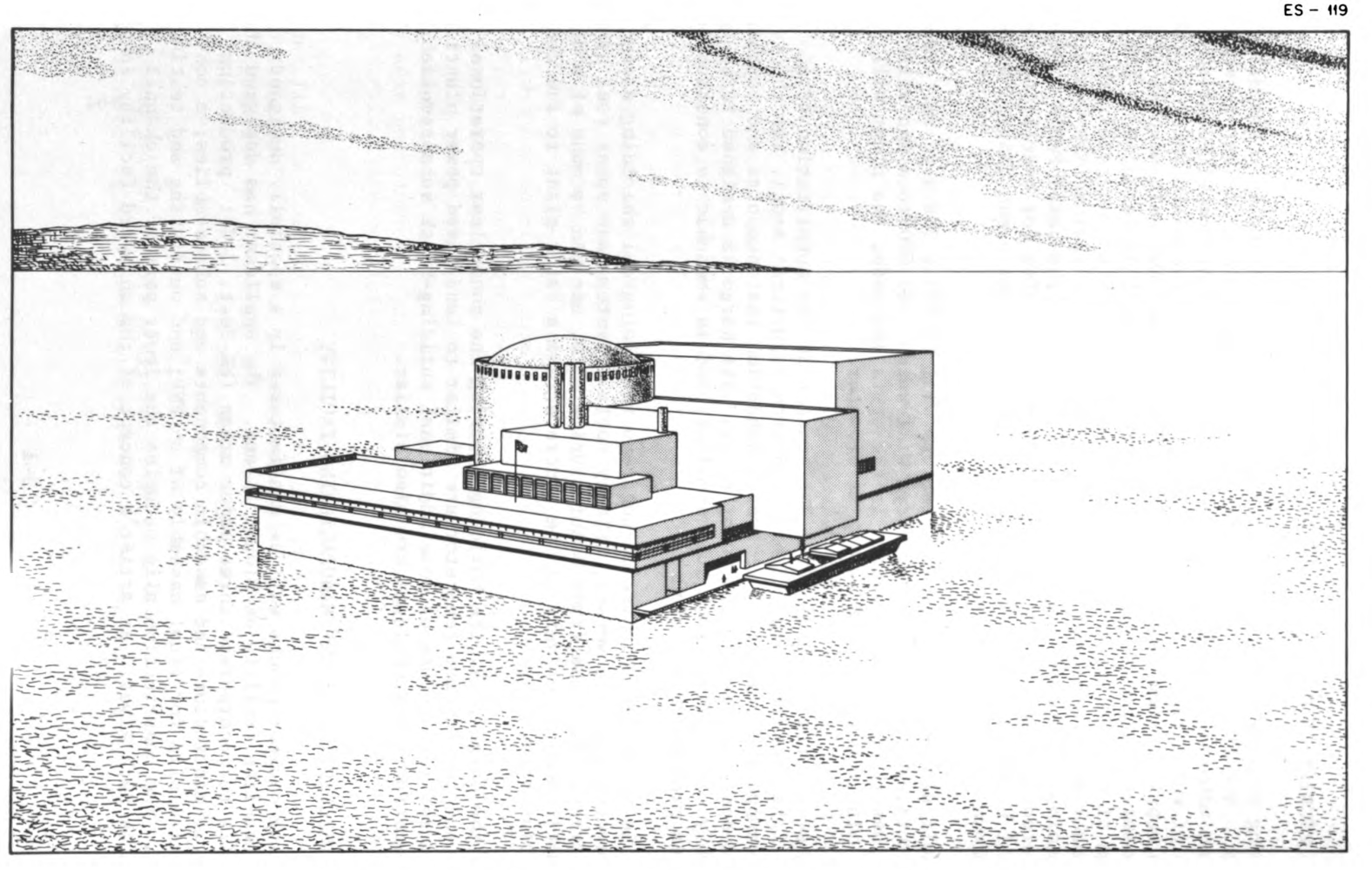
Artist's sketch of a completed floating nuclear plant of the Offshore Power Systems design

Offshore Power Systems (OPS) was a 1970 joint venture between Westinghouse Electric Company, which constructed nuclear generating plants, and Newport News Shipbuilding and Drydock, which had recently merged with Tenneco, to create floating nuclear power plants at Jacksonville, Florida.

== History ==
The MH-1A was the first floating nuclear power station, built by Martin Marietta for the US Army in the early 1960s. The reactor was installed in a converted Liberty ship hull and used by the Army from 1968 to 1975 in the Panama Canal Zone. It produced relatively low power output of 10 megawatts compared to the projected 2,300 megawatt capacity of the OPS plants.

The much larger concept was envisioned in 1969 by Richard Eckert, the engineer at Public Service Electric and Gas Company (PSE&G) tasked with identifying power plant sites. He discovered that there were very few suitable locations, but most were close to the Atlantic Ocean. Westinghouse began the project in 1970 based on two premises: all nuclear power plants were custom built and designed, and local residents close to the proposed location of a nuclear facility typically took a NIMBY attitude. Therefore, identical reactors mass-produced from a "factory" location could be built quicker and at less expense, and if the power plant was located miles from populated areas (in the ocean), there would be less opposition. The idea was promoted by PSE&G as the Atlantic Nuclear Power Plant. PSE&G ordered two 1,150 megawatt reactors for the project in 1972, and two more the following year for operation in the mid-1980s. OPS decided to locate their production facility at the Port of Jacksonville.

== Concept ==
The power plants would be built with two reactors on a man-made island constructed of steel, anchored in the Atlantic a few miles off the coastline. The islands would be protected by a massive concrete breakwater composed of 18,000 dolosses, each weighing 80 tons, designed to withstand hurricanes, tornadoes, moderate earthquakes and collision by a loaded tanker. The actual power plant would be towed, like a barge, by ocean tugboats to its destination.

== Opposition ==
Opposition to the project was both local and national because many people questioned the safety of nuclear power. Jacksonville resident Joe Cury was very vocal and actively protested whenever the Jacksonville Electric Authority was involved. and Ralph Nader became involved with the protests for a short time.

== Construction ==
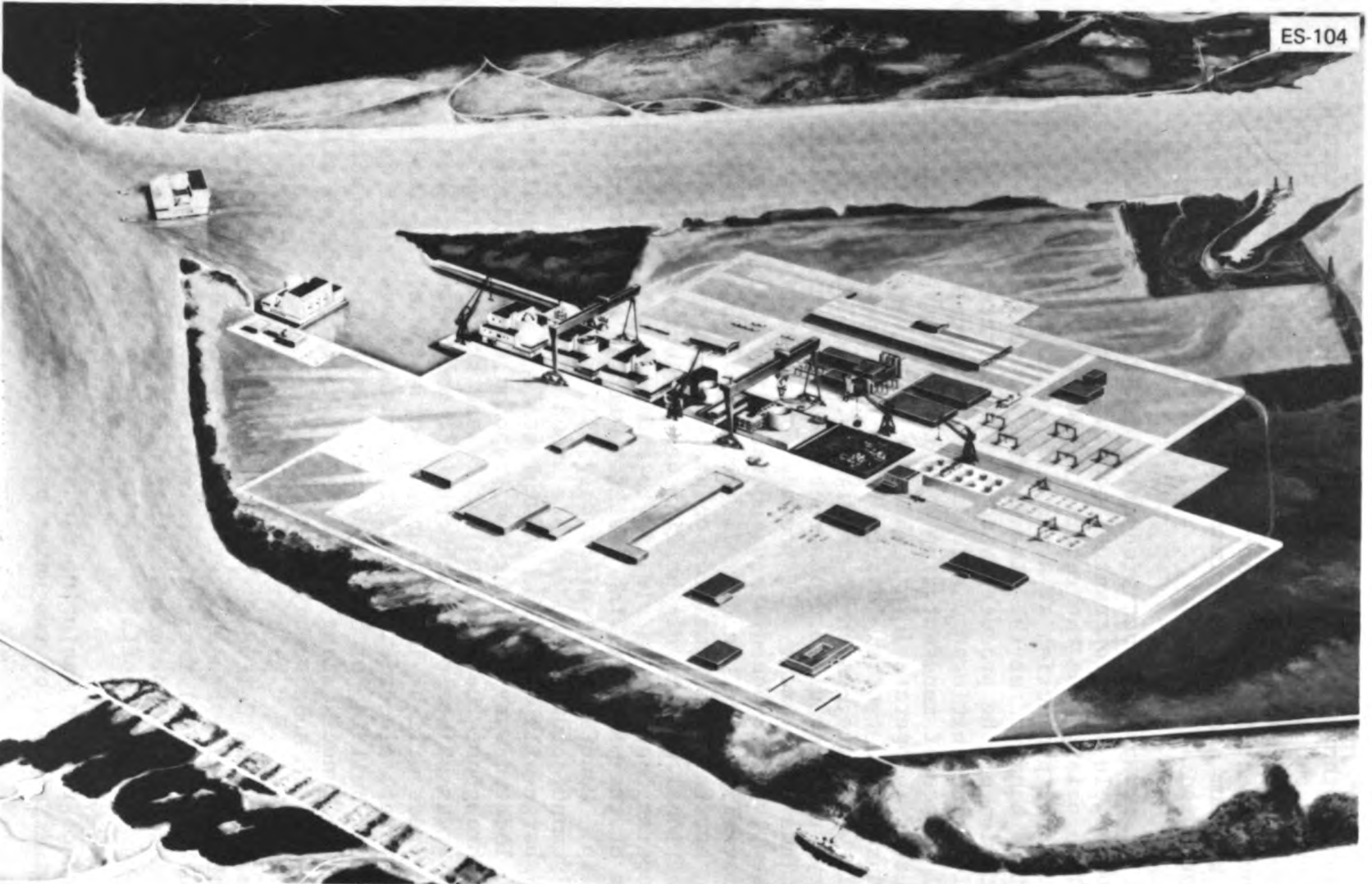
Sketch of the a completed floating nuclear power plant manufacturing facility from Offshore Power Systems

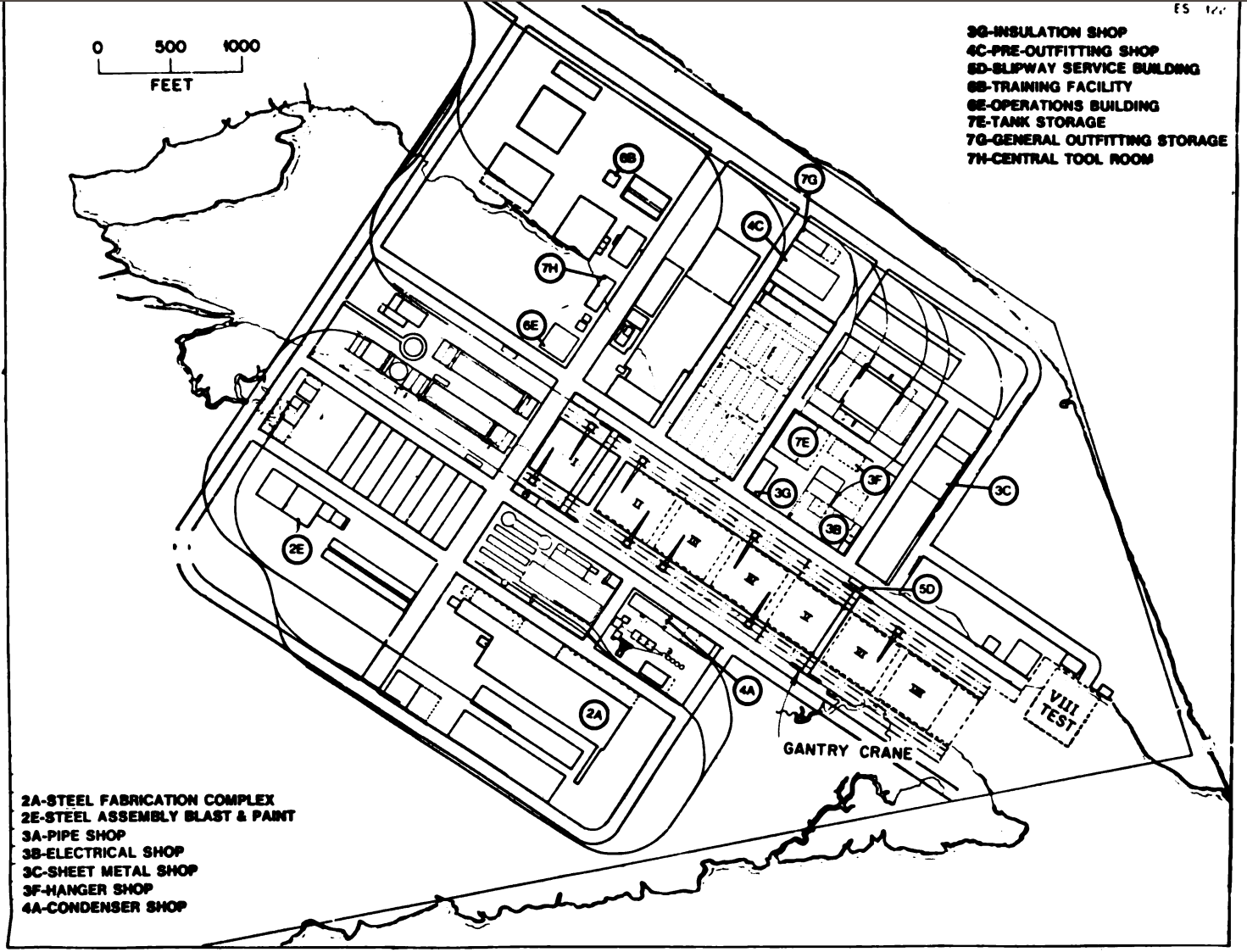
Overall layout plan of a floating nuclear plant manufacturing facility in the four plants per year configuration from OPS

Construction of the new facility was projected to cost $200 million and create 10,000 new jobs when completed in 1976. Contracts were signed by OPS and PSE&G for two plants. PSE&G paid for the engineering and blueprints, license expenses and startup costs for the manufacturing facility. Westinghouse named Zeke Zechella to be president of OPS in 1972.

Much of Blount Island was swampy land until the early 1970s when OPS obtained 850+ acres (3.4 km2) from the Jacksonville Port Authority (JPA) for $2,000/acre. OPS had the muck removed and replaced it with clean fill, then installed utilities, roads, a bridge and other infrastructure. The floating platform upon which the plant was to be built would be 400' square, the size of three football fields laid sideline to sideline. The harbor basin they created had to be slightly wider, longer, and 40' deep. The world's largest bridge crane, capable of lifting the dome of the reactor containment building was purchased for $17 million and installed across the basin. The crane had a height of 130 feet, a span of 675 feet and a lift capacity of 2 million pounds. During construction, over 1,000 workers were involved, and a total of $125 million was invested in the property and facility. Two other utilities, the Southern Company in Atlanta and JEA in Jacksonville, both sent letters of commitment to show that they were serious about purchasing a plant; however, no plants were ever built.

The NRC issued a license authorizing the manufacture of up to 8 of the OPS reactors on December 17, 1982.

== Cancellation ==
Although OPS did not have Federal approval to build the plants in the 1970s, the biggest reason why OPS was not successful was the 1973 oil crisis. Less oil available resulted in higher oil prices, which encouraged conservation and less demand for electricity. PSE&G did not need the additional capacity from the nuclear generators they had ordered, so PSE&G requested a two-year delay. After the embargo ended, oil prices remained high and effects of the 1973–75 recession made economic conditions worse. When President Jimmy Carter placed a moratorium on nuclear power plant construction, OPS began laying off employees. New Jersey Governor Brendan Byrne was opposed to the floating plants, and chided the NRC for not spending more time investigating the possible consequences of a nuclear accident, no matter how unlikely the event. PSE&G cancelled their OPS power plant contracts in 1978, and OPS had no customers, but they still sought Nuclear Regulatory Commission approval in the hope of building plants in the future. Then came the Three Mile Island accident in 1979, which required additional safety features in the design. Zeke Zechella left OPS and retired as a Westinghouse Vice President in 1980 after 27 years at the company.

In late 1981, OPS still employed 231 people and hoped for approval that year. The city of Jacksonville sued OPS and the Port Authority in an attempt to reclaim the property, assessed at nearly $38 million, but lost. Westinghouse finally received NRC approval to build as many as eight plants, but no utilities were interested.

On February 17, 1984, Westinghouse announced that their OPS company would shut down by September 1, 1984. Lack of market and technology duplication were cited as reasons for the closure. The company had been paying $1 million per year in property taxes, and sold the Blount Island property to Gate Petroleum for $17 million in 1985.

== Reactor data ==
Reactor unit	Reactor type	Net capacity	Gross capacity	Construction started (Planned)	Electricity Grid	Commercial Operation	Shutdown
Floating-1	PWR	1,150 MW	1,211 MW	Cancelled Plan on 01.01.1979			

== See also ==
- Floating nuclear power station
