= Frank I. Cobb =

Frank Irving Cobb (August 6, 1869 – December 21, 1923) was an American journalist, primarily an editorial writer, from 1896 to his death. In 1904, he succeeded Joseph Pulitzer as editor of the latter's New York World newspaper. He became famous for his editorials in support of the policies of liberal Democrats, especially Woodrow Wilson, during the Progressive Era.

== Career ==
Cobb was born to a Yankee farm family in Shawnee County, Kansas, which includes the state capital Topeka. His parents were Minor H. Cobb and Mathilda A (Née Clark) Cobb, who was the first White child born in Grand Rapids. He grew up in a lumber camp in Michigan. Educated at local schools with a term at the state college, at age 21, he became a cub reporter on the Grand Rapids Herald for $6 a week. He moved up to political correspondent and finally city editor. After working on the rival Grand Rapids Daily Eagle (acquired by the Grand Rapids Press in 1892), Cobb went to a major metropolitan paper, the Evening News of Detroit, as political correspondent covering state politics. His vivid writing style and strong opinion brought a promotion to editorial writer in 1896, and chief editorial writer in 1899.

He was married first in 1897 to Delia S. Bailey and second, on October 2, 1913, to Margaret Hubbard Ayer, a well-known newspaper woman. He and Ayer were the parents of columnist Hubbard Cobb. He worked in New York City but retreated as often as possible to their suburban estate near Westport, Connecticut.

Cobb was editor of the World for almost twenty years, from 1904 until his death from cancer on December 21, 1923. A few months later, his widow received a special Pulitzer Prize "awarded to the widow of the late Frank I. Cobb, New York World, in recognition of the distinction of her husband's editorial writing and service." The organization now lists it as one of the Editorial Writing Pulitzers, which The Boston Herald won in 1924.

== New York World ==
Cobb was an editorial writer at the Detroit Free Press from 1900 to 1904, when he was hired by Joseph Pulitzer, who owned the crusading New York City newspaper The World, then one of the two largest papers in the country. Cobb soon became Pulitzer's chief advisor and editorial writer.

The World reached the common man by a variety of news and entertainment features, and was a power in the Democratic Party because of its liberalism and its crusades against big business and government corruption. Cobb's hard-hitting editorials were widely read and reprinted.

At the 1912 Democratic National Convention in Baltimore, Cobb was a leader in making Woodrow Wilson, the intellectual Governor of New Jersey, the Democratic nominee for president. Cobb and Wilson became lifelong allies and personal friends.

== Relations with Pulitzer ==
Cobb was a fiercely independent journalist who resisted Pulitzer's attempts to "run the office" from his home. However, the elder man might try, he simply could not keep from meddling with Cobb's work. Time after time, they battled, often with heated language. While they found common ground in their support of Woodrow Wilson as president, they disagreed on many other issues. Cobb wrote a precisely worded resignation when Joseph's son took over administrative responsibility in 1907. The editorial was printed in every New York paper except for The World. Pulitzer raged at the insult, but slowly began to respect Cobb's editorials and independent spirit. Exchanges, commentaries, and messages between them increased. The good rapport between the two was based largely on Cobb's flexibility. In May 1908, Cobb and Pulitzer met to outline plans for a consistent editorial policy. However, the editorial policy did waver on occasion. Renewed battles broke out over the most trivial matters. Pulitzer's demands for editorials on contemporary breaking news led to overwork by Cobb. Pulitzer revealed concern by sending him on a six-week tour of Europe to restore his spirit. Pulitzer died shortly after Cobb's return (in October 1911); then Cobb published Pulitzer's beautifully written resignation. Cobb retained the editorial policies he had shared with Pulitzer until he died of cancer in 1923.
