= The American Home =

US magazine from 1928 to 1977

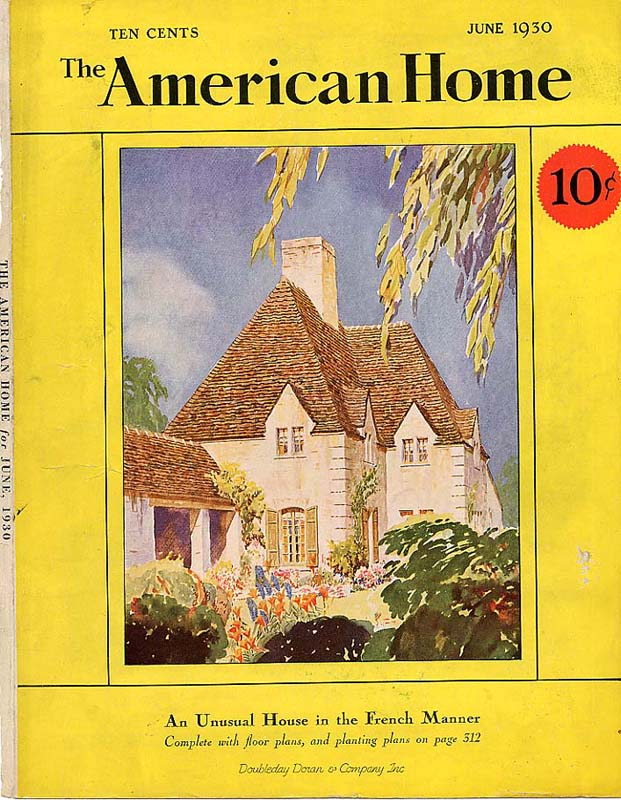
- June 1930 issue of The American Home
- Frequency: Monthly
- Founded: 1928
- First issue: October 1928
- Final issue: 1977
- Country: United States
- Based in: New York City

The American Home was a monthly magazine published in the United States from 1928 to 1977. Its subjects included domestic architecture, interior design, landscape design and gardening.

== History and profile ==
The American Home was a continuation of the magazine Garden & Home Builder. It was published by Nelson Doubleday of Doubleday, Doran & Company. Ellen Diffin Wangner edited the first issues, October 1928 to March 1929. The American Home lost money its first four years, and occasionally entire issues were omitted. William Herbert Eaton, its circulation manager, became publisher in 1932. He bought the magazine in 1935, forming American Home Publishing Company, which continued to publish it in New York City until he sold the magazine in 1958 to Curtis Publishing Company, its single-copy distributor. Under Eaton, the magazine was refocused toward the upper middle class reader, leaving the higher end of the home market to fellow Doubleday magazine Country Life, which Eaton also bought.

By 1953, The American Home had a paid circulation of over 3 million, and reached a peak circulation of 3.7 million in 1962. As part of its desire to move out of mass circulation publications, Curtis sold the magazine in 1968 to Downe Communications. John Mack Carter purchased it in 1973, and it was acquired in late 1975 by the Charter Company.

In 1975 Charter Company president and chairman Raymond K. Mason installed Leda Sanford as president, publisher and editor-in-chief with a mandate to reposition the magazine and stem losses by attracting new readership. Sanford was the first female publisher of a national American magazine. Her goal was to maintain a circulation of 2.5 million and appeal to newly liberated women. She said she wanted the magazine to “speak intelligently to the college-educated and informed woman,” telling the targeted reader how to “run her home with flair, beauty and pizzazz.” The publication saw slight gains, but not enough to save what the New York Times referred to as a “fixture on the American publishing scene.”

After several years of losses, and in an era that saw the closure of the mass circulation magazines Life, Look, and The Saturday Evening Post, the last issue of American Home, with a cover date of February 1978, was published in late 1977. It was then merged with the Charter magazine Redbook.

== See also ==
- Leda Sanford
