= Raymond K. Mason =

American businessman (1927–2020)

Raymond Knight Mason
- Born: February 28, 1927; Jacksonville, Duval County, Florida, United States
- Died: January 2, 2020 (aged 92); Jacksonville, Florida U.S.
- Occupations: Banker, Investor, Businessman
- Years active: 1946-2019
- Employer: Charter Company
- Known for: Making deals
- Spouse: Julia Minerva Rogers (1948-2019; her death)
- Parent(s): Varina Knight and William Marcy Mason

Raymond Knight Mason (February 28, 1927 - January 2, 2020) was an American business leader for nearly sixty years, almost 40 as head of the Charter Company in Jacksonville, Florida. Charter was in the Fortune 500 for 11 years beginning in 1974 and ranked 61st in 1984.

== Personal life ==
Mason was born in Jacksonville, Florida, in 1927. He served in the Merchant Marine during World War II. Raymond and his wife, Minerva were married in 1948 and went to New York City for their honeymoon. They enjoyed New York, and returned so often that in 1972, they purchased one of 75 co-ops at The Pierre, a 41-floor Hotel at the corner of Fifth Avenue and 61st Street that looks like a French chateau. The couple had four children: Raymond, Jr, Walter, Varina and Marcy; they celebrated their 70th wedding anniversary in 2018.

Mason graduated from the University of North Carolina in 1949 with a B.A. in economics and immediately took over his family's Jacksonville business, the Mason Lumber Company.

== Charter companies ==
Mason founded the Charter Company that same year and was the chairman, president and chief executive officer until 1987. The business was divided into three groups.

- Charter Oil - Because of his work with the oil industry, Mason developed a close friendship with Gerald Ford in the early 1970s. King Faisal of Saudi Arabia asked Mason to speak on his behalf to then President Richard Nixon, but Mason was unable to access Nixon because of Watergate. Then Vice President Ford saw him instead, which started their friendship.
- Charter Insurance
- Charter Communications

== Other business ==
He was a director of Florida National Banks of Florida, Inc. from 1960 to 1974; in 1978, he became chairman, chief executive officer and controlling shareholder of American Banks of Florida, Inc., until their merger with SouthTrust of Alabama, Inc. in 1998.

Mason has served as vice chairman of Juniper Content Corporation since January 2007 and as a director of Firestone Communications, which operated a Spanish children's television network. That same year, he acquired a 35 percent interest in Intrepid Capital Management Inc., a Jacksonville Beach investment management firm. He also has an interest in AccentHealth, which provides medical information for consumers. Mason has been chairman of Rebuilding Services, Inc. (since July 1949), Acorn Ventures, Inc. (since August 1998), 12K, LLC (since December 2003), managing partner of Middle East Ventures and Connemara Capital Company, LLC (since December 2003), which are private investment companies with investments in real estate, media, financial services, oil and gas and transportation.

== Mentor ==
Edward Ball was a powerful figure in business and politics in Florida for decades despite the fact that he never held public office and did not own the assets he controlled. He worked for and with his brother-in-law, Alfred I. du Pont for nine years before running the du Pont trust's businesses by himself for another 46 years. Mr. Ball was Mason's mentor, friend and confidant for decades. Raymond Mason, in turn, was claimed as a mentor by at least a dozen of his young executives at Charter.

In 1976, Mason collaborated with Virginia Harrison to author a book about the life of Edward Ball, Confusion to the enemy : a biography of Edward Ball. This book was the "authorized" biography, whereas the book, Ed Ball, confusion to the enemy by Leon Odell Griffith, published the previous year, was done by an outsider.

Mason also wrote a booklet about Charter, "The history of the Charter Company: its challenges and opportunities", published by Newcomen Society in North America, 1983.

== Homes ==
Mason owned two unique properties, both of which were acquired through Edward Ball.

=== Jacksonville ===
Epping Forest's DuPont Mansion

Epping Forest was the former estate of Alfred I. du Pont and Jessie Ball du Pont, Edward’s sister. When Jessie died in 1970, Ed Ball arranged the sale of Epping Forest to Raymond Mason.

Mason was good friends with President Gerald Ford and hosted talks between Ford and Egyptian President Anwar Sadat in November, 1975 at Epping Forest, Mason's home. Ex-President Ford became a consultant to the Charter Company and attended the funeral of Charter president Jack T. Donnell in 1982.

Mason sold Epping Forest to Herb Peyton and Gate Petroleum in 1984 when Charter was in financial difficulty.

=== Ireland ===
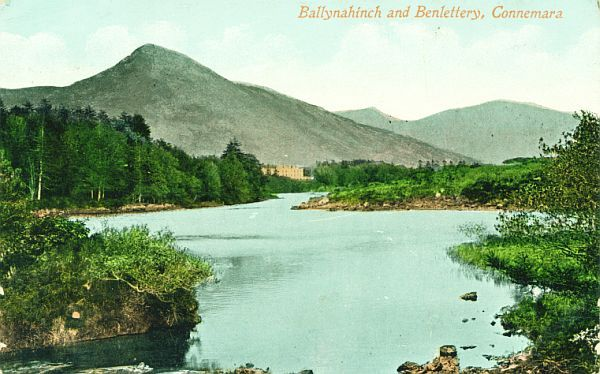
Area view in 1910s; Ballynahinch castle at base of mountain

The Mason mansion, which the Masons still own, is a castle in Ballynahinch, County Galway, Ireland, renowned for its salmon fishing, its 350-acre (1.4 km^{2}) landscaped estate and 13,000 acres (53 km^{2}) of woodcock hunting.

Minerva Mason heads a syndicate that has owned Ballynahinch Castle since the late 1970s. It has been run as a hotel since the 1940s and was purchased by Edward Ball in 1957 for a fraction of its present value, which Mrs. Mason estimates at around $15 million.

Mrs. Mason stays about "three months a year in a separate house on the castle grounds" and admits that they spent "millions" on the castle's 28 guest rooms. They recently added an annex of 12 rooms.

== Philanthropy ==
The Eagle Foundation, Inc. is the entity used by the Masons for charitable donations. On December 7, 2006, the Cummer Museum of Art and Gardens received a $5 million gift to help "create a place of culture and beauty for all", according to museum founder Ninah Cummer's vision. Minerva's association with the museum goes back to the building's opening on November 11, 1961. She was a member of the advisory group to the board and served on the music committee.

The Masons also contributed to the complete renovation of the Swisher Theatre at Jacksonville University, which re-opened in February, 2007.
