= Charter Company =

Defunct oil refining, insurance, and communications conglomerate (1949-1992)

The Charter Company
- Type: Public
- Traded as: NYSE: CHR
- Industry: Oil refining; Insurance; Communications
- Founded: 1949; 77 years ago, in Jacksonville, Florida, United States
- Founder: Raymond Knight Mason
- Defunct: 1992
- Fate: Divested; Entertainment group acquired by Viacom
- Successor: Spelling Entertainment Group Inc.
- Headquarters: Jacksonville, Florida, United States

The Charter Company of Jacksonville, Florida was a conglomerate with more than 180 subsidiaries that was in the Fortune 500 for 11 years beginning in 1974 and ranked 61st in 1984. The company filed for bankruptcy protection in late 1984, eventually selling off all of its businesses and purchasing Spelling Entertainment Inc. to form Spelling Entertainment Group Inc in 1992.

== History ==
The Charter Company was started in Jacksonville, Florida, in 1949 by Jacksonville native, Raymond Knight Mason, who had just graduated from college. The company's roots were from the Mason Lumber Company, founded in 1919.

Edward Ball, a powerful figure in Florida business and politics for decades, was Mason's friend and mentor. Ball worked for Alfred I. du Pont for nine years as a business associate before du Pont's death in 1935, then managed the Alfred I. duPont Testamentary Trust's assets for another 46 years.

Charter started with a group of Florida mortgage, banking and land-developing firms. The corporate headquarters was located in the Universal-Marion Building at 21 West Church Street. The company then bought 60 small gas stations in 1968.

In 1970, Charter purchased a petroleum operation for $70 million from the Signal Companies. Included in the deal was a small gasoline refinery in Houston, Texas, in need of updating, a string of gas stations in the Southeast and a handful of questionable tanker contracts. Four years later, when the 1973 oil crisis struck, Charter cashed in.

Also in 1970, congress repealed an exemption which allowed charitable trusts to control banks, forcing the du Pont Trust to divest itself of the Florida National Bank Group, which Charter purchased. Charter also owned 8.4% of the St. Joe Paper Company, one of the largest assets in the du Pont Trust, while St. Joe owned 22% of Charter. The two companies exchanged shares in 1972 with the intention of merging.

Senator Joseph Tydings was an investment partner in Charter since 1964 with $2 million in equity. At one time, Tydings was the largest Charter stockholder outside of the Mason family. A Life magazine article in 1970 suggested that the senator used his influence to assist Charter in business deals, but no laws were broken.

In 1975, Charter purchased Redbook from Norton Simon Inc. In 1978, Charter acquired Downe Communications, the publisher of the Ladies' Home Journal. Charter had had a controlling stake in Downe for several years prior. The year before, Downe had acquired Bartell, the publisher of such magazines as Sport.

Charter moved their corporate offices to the Universal-Marion building in 1979.

Charter acknowledged that in 1978 and 1979, two of its oil executives had discussions with fugitive financier Robert Vesco; Mr. Vesco and Mr. Mason had business discussions as far back as 1971. Vesco was living in the Bahamas and had declined requests that he return to the U.S. to face charges that he swindled investors out of millions of dollars. The Senate Judiciary Committee was investigating connections between Billy Carter, brother of President Jimmy Carter, Vesco, and the country of Libya.

Carey Energy Corporation, with $550 million in assets, was acquired by Charter in 1979 for $4 million in cash, $16 million in Charter convertible preferred stock and a consulting job for Edward M. Carey (brother of New York Governor Hugh Carey) paying $200,000 per year. Carey Energy's principal assets were a 65% ownership in a Bahamas refinery and the New England Petroleum Company, a fuel oil distributorship based in Brooklyn which sold the fuel produced by the refinery up and down the Atlantic coast.

In 1980, Charter decided to buy Commonwealth Oil Refining Company and their Puerto Rican refinery, which processed 160,000 bbl (25,000 m^{3}). per-day, for $650 million. The company also had plans to build a 100,000 bbl (16,000 m^{3}) per-day refinery in Alaska to process the 75,000 bbl (11,900 m^{3}) per-day of North Slope crude that they were promised.

== Operations ==
The company was split along three lines: oil refining, insurance and communications.

Year	Revenue	Net earnings	Earnings per share
1973	$481,900,000	$20,500,000	$4.61
1974	$1,170,000,000	$40,300,000	$10.71
1975	$1,046,200,000	$5,400,000	$.19
1976	$1,190,900,000	$16,900,000	$.81
1977	$1,481,600,000	$20,000,000	$1.00
1978	$2,046,300,000	$23,300,000	$1.17
1979	$4,296,400,000	$365,300,000	$14.83
1980	$4,421,100,000	$50,200,000	$1.59
1981	$4,966,200,000	$7,700,000	$.06
1982	$4,017,200,000	$35,300,000	$1.04
1983	$5,656,800,000	$61,700,000	$2.35
1984	($29,800,000)	($71,100,000)	$0
1985	$1,559,700,000	$1,300,000	$0
1986	$1,136,300,000	$153,200,000	$3.23
1987	$1,042,600,000	$46,900,000	$.98
1988	$479,600,000	$58,600,000	$1.22
1989	$665,100,000	$5,300,000	$.10

== Raymond Knight Mason ==
Mason had a reputation for eccentricity, but employees said he had "his own ways". Mason owned two special properties, both of which were acquired through his friend, Ed Ball. Epping Forest was the former estate of Alfred I. du Pont and Jessie Ball du Pont, Ball's sister. The Mason mansion, which Mason still owned in 2005, is a castle in Ballynahinch, County Galway, Ireland, and was once owned by Ed Ball.

== Performance ==
The company had sales totaling about $5 billion in 1981, while their earnings were $.06 per share, the lowest point in a decade. The drop was attributed to the oil glut, which drove down prices.

That year, Jack Donnell began eliminating some of the communications and publishing properties and whittled down the list of subsidiaries to a manageable group. Charter had net earnings of $53.89 million, or $2.01 a share in 1983. In 1984, the company reported a net loss of $749.34 million, $685 million of which the company attributed to discontinued operations, the expenses of filing for bankruptcy and provisions for estimated losses on disposal of assets which were partially offset by gains on assets sold.

== Trouble ==
The 1980s began with earnings down dramatically, and things went from bad to worse.

=== Helicopter crash ===
The Charter Company suffered a tragedy in the foggy, early hours of July 29, 1982, when four senior executives died in Ireland when their helicopter crashed en route from Mason's Ballynahinch Castle to Shannon Airport. Killed were Jack T. Donnell, 53, Charter's president and chief operating officer and three from Charter Oil: Dudley K. Parker, 49, president; Barry L. Green, 34, executive vice president; and Jay L. Lammons, 43, senior vice president.

Zeke Zechella, who had joined Charter in 1980 after leaving Offshore Power Systems, was named president of Charter, replacing Donnell.

=== Toxic waste lawsuit ===
A lawsuit was filed on December 16, 1983, seeking more than $1.8 billion in damages. The Charter Company dba Charter Oil Company of Jacksonville were one of four companies named as defendants.

Independent Petrochemical Corporation (IPC), was a wholly owned subsidiary of Charter Oil. IPC was contracted through Northeastern Pharmaceutical & Chemical Company (NEPACCO) to dispose of a dioxin, specifically 2,3,7,8-Tetrachlorodibenzodioxin, which was a byproduct of hexachlorophene production and a known carcinogen. IPC contracted a local waste management company run by Russell Bliss to dispose of the dioxin. Instead of properly disposing the dioxin in an incinerator, Bliss mixed the dioxin and other waste chemicals into used motor oil, which he regularly used to spray dirt roads and arenas to keep dust down. Bliss sprayed it as a dust suppressant at various locations throughout Missouri. The sprayings occurred over a period of at least two months, with each spraying lasting about 30–40 minutes. The waste oil contained dioxins and dioxin-like compounds, chemical compounds that were known carcinogens. The discharge of the dioxin-contaminated oil was the basis of claims against IPC by the federal government, the State of Missouri, and over 1,600 private plaintiffs. The private suits sought an aggregate $4 billion in compensatory damages and an identical amount in punitive damages. IPC entered into settlements covering all of the claims which included over $100 million owed to the federal government for clean-up of various sites in Missouri.

=== Bankruptcy ===
When Edward M. Carey sold Carey Energy Corporation to Charter in 1979, his comment was: "Being in the oil business is like having a bear by the tail. You have to keep feeding it. You have to feed it to get it to perform."

At the time, Carey's bear (Carey Energy) had been in a prolonged mauling mood because he was unable to feed it (obtain a source of crude oil for the refinery). Five years later, the bear was hungry and got angry again.

One of the primary reasons for Charter's bankruptcy was the financial market. Oil prices dropped sharply and companies lost their ability to get trade credit, so they were unable to purchase crude oil to feed the bear and that forced Charter into Chapter 11, according to Mason.

The Charter Company and 43 subsidiaries (including IPC) filed for protection under Chapter 11 of the bankruptcy law on April 20, 1984. In conjunction with the bankruptcy filing, the company laid off 200 people in its Jacksonville office—which represented almost a 50% loss—and an equal number in Houston. Charter closed their offices in the Universal-Marion building.

Mason sold Epping Forest to Herb Peyton in 1984 and resigned as Charter's chairman. Company president Zeke Zechella retired the following year. Most of the company's subsidiaries were sold off before emerging from court protection in 1987. Creditors received Charter stock representing a 50.5% ownership in the company in payment for Charter's debts. Carl Lindner acquired control of Charter in bankruptcy court. One distinctive element of Charter's bankruptcy was its stockholder equity. Typically, company stock would be worthless, but Jacksonville attorney Stephen Busey, who represented Charter in the legal proceedings, stated that it is unusual for shareholders to get as much value as Charter's stockholders did.

== A long, drawn out ending ==
Charter vanished from Jacksonville's headlines and former employees found positions at other businesses when the bankruptcy was discharged in 1988. Carl Lindner's American Financial Corporation, which owned 53% of Charter's stock, moved the company from Jacksonville to Cincinnati, Ohio.

In early 1992, Charter announced an agreement to sell all remaining oil operations in a management buyout. That transaction left Charter with one business, an 82% stake in Spelling Entertainment that they acquired on April 6, 1991. Spelling was a television production company that produced over a dozen popular drama series. On March 31, 1992, Spelling and Charter agreed to merge. On October 5, 1992, the Charter Company was renamed Spelling Entertainment Group, Inc. and updated its NYSE ticker symbol from "CHR" to "SP". In 1993, Blockbuster Entertainment acquired controlling interest in Spelling. Viacom acquired Blockbuster's stake in Spelling in 1994 and purchased its remaining stock in 1999, effectively subsuming the final part of Charter Company into its larger corporate structure.

The current American cable company Charter Communications is completely unrelated to Charter Company.
