= Eugene du Pont =

American businessman

Eugène du Pont
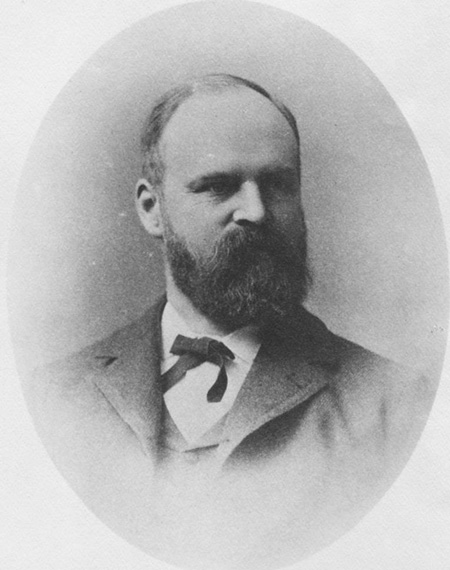
- Du Pont in 1880
- Born: November 16, 1840; New Castle County, Delaware
- Died: January 28, 1902 (aged 61); Christiana Hundred, Delaware
- Resting place: Du Pont de Nemours Cemetery
- Education: University of Pennsylvania (B.A. 1861)
- Board member of: E.I. du Pont de Nemours & Co.
- Spouse: Amélia Elizabeth du Pont
- Children: Anne Ridgely; Alexis Irénée III; Mary Van Dyke; Eugene Jr.; Amy Elizabeth; Julia Sophia
- Parents: Alexis Irénée du Pont; Joanna Maria Smith

Eugène du Pont (November 16, 1840 – January 28, 1902) was an American businessman who served as the first head of the modern-day DuPont corporation.

== Life and education ==
Du Pont was born on November 16, 1840, at Hagley House in New Castle County, Delaware, son of Alexis Irénée du Pont and grandson of DuPont founder Éleuthère Irénée du Pont (1771–1834). His brothers were Alexis Irénée du Pont Jr. and Francis Gurney du Pont. Eugène was the first head of the modern DuPont corporation, seeing the corporation into the 20th century.

Eugène graduated from the University of Pennsylvania in 1861 with a bachelor of arts degree.

== Career ==
After he graduated from Penn in 1861, he became an assistant to his older cousin, Lammot du Pont (1831–1884), at the Brandywine Mills laboratory and by 1886, filed two patent applications for a gunpowder press and new variety of powder, brown prismatic. He became junior partner in 1864. He succeeded his uncle, Henry du Pont (1812–1889), as senior partner in 1889.

As senior partner, du Pont saw the completion of a new office in Wilmington and the new invention called the telephone. He also saw the rise of the dynamite industry and helped form the Eastern Dynamite Company in 1895. 1912, the Eastern Dynamite Company formally merged with DuPont.

After du Pont's death, the company was brought under control by three of his nephews, Alfred I. du Pont, T. Coleman du Pont and Pierre S. du Pont.

== Personal life ==
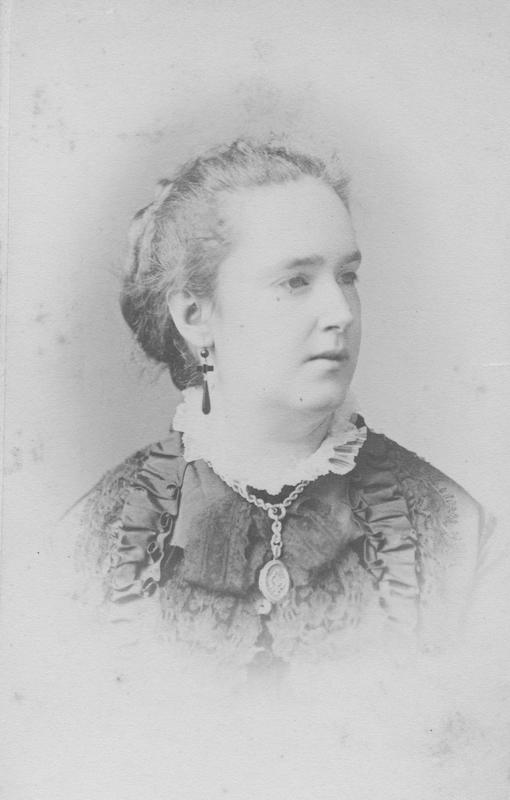
Amélia Elizabeth du Pont

Eugène married Amélia Elizabeth du Pont, who was also born a du Pont as the daughter of Charles I. du Pont (1797–1869), nephew of Éleuthère Irénée. Together they had had:

- Anne Ridgely du Pont (1867–1944)
- Alexis Irénée du Pont III (1869–1921)
- Mary Van Dyke du Pont (1871–1871)
- Eugène Irénée du Pont Jr. (1873–1956)
- Amy Elizabeth du Pont (1875–1962), who did not marry.
- Julia Sophia du Pont

Eugène du Pont died at his home in Christiana Hundred near Wilmington, Delaware on January 28, 1902.

=== Descendants ===
His daughter Amy Elizabeth du Pont was a prominent benefactor of the University of Delaware. His granddaughter, Ethel du Pont (1916–1965), was the first wife of Franklin D. Roosevelt Jr. (1914-1988).
