= Henry du Pont =

American politician (1812–1889)

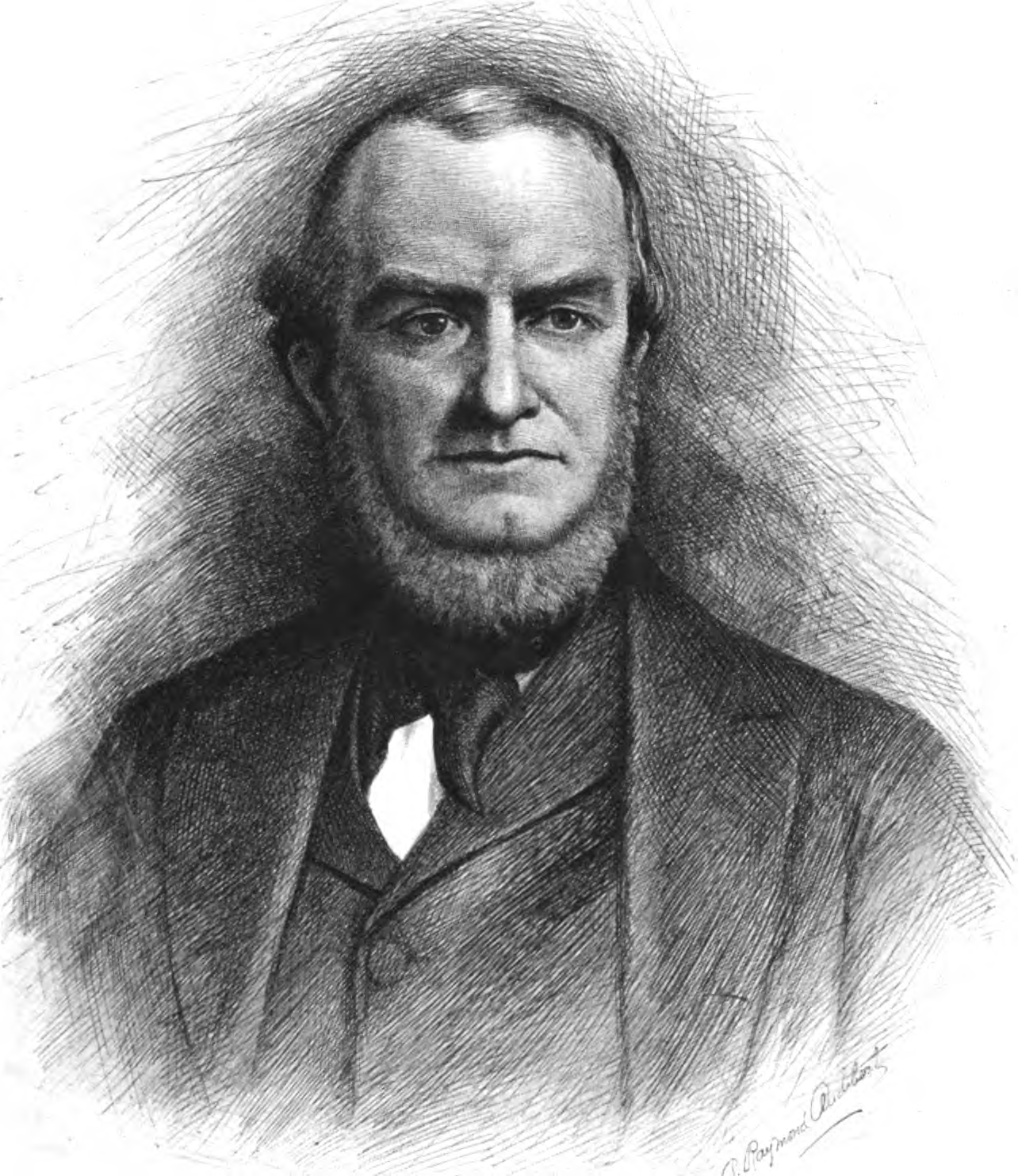
- Born: August 8, 1812; Wilmington, Delaware
- Died: August 8, 1889 (aged 77); Wilmington, Delaware
- Education: United States Military Academy
- Spouse: Louisa Gerhard
- Children: 9

Henry du Pont (August 8, 1812 – August 8, 1889) was an American military officer and businessman from Delaware, and a member of the Du Pont family.

== Early life and education ==
Du Pont was born at Eleutherian Mills, Wilmington, Delaware, the second son of Éleuthère Irénée du Pont and his wife, Sophie Madeleine Dalmas. E.I. du Pont was a French immigrant and gunpowder manufacturer who became the founder of E. I. du Pont de Nemours and Company, a chemical company that is still in existence.

Henry du Pont was educated at the American Classical and Military Academy in Germantown, Pennsylvania. He graduated from there in 1829 and enrolled at the United States Military Academy in West Point, New York. Du Pont graduated from West Point in 1833 and was commissioned a second lieutenant in the United States Army.

== Military and manufacturing careers ==
Du Pont's first assignment was to the Fourth Artillery Regiment, stationed in Fort Monroe, Virginia. Soon after he arrived in Virginia, du Pont's regiment was ordered to Fort Mitchell, Alabama, a frontier posting on land occupied by the Muscogee. After a year of active duty, du Pont acceded to his father's wishes by resigning his commission and joining the family business. When his father died the following year, du Pont worked with his brother, Alfred, and his brother-in-law, Jacques Antoine Bidermann, in managing the company. In 1837, he married Louisa Gerhard, with whom he would have nine children, including a son, Henry A. du Pont, the future United States Senator. In 1850, Alfred retired from the family business and Henry du Pont became the head of the firm, which by that time had been joined by his younger brother, Alexis Irénée du Pont, and his nephew, Lammot.

The outbreak of the Crimean War in 1854 boosted the company's sales and, combined with chemical innovations by Lammot, led to increased growth and profitability. The start of the American Civil War created another market for gunpowder, but du Pont refused to sell to the nascent Confederacy. A member of the Whig Party, du Pont hoped for compromise as war approached, but once it began he became a strong supporter of President Abraham Lincoln. Since 1846, du Pont had held the post of adjutant general of Delaware; in May 1861, Governor William Burton promoted him to Major General and placed him in charge of all soldiers recruited in the state.

Upon taking office, du Pont ordered every man of military age in Delaware to take an oath of allegiance to the United States, or else to surrender his weapons. Burton suspended the order, but du Pont convinced Major General John Adams Dix, commanding federal troops in Baltimore, to send some soldiers to Delaware to guard against rebellion there. Du Pont and Dix continued to guard against Confederate sympathizers into 1862, when soldiers under their command disarmed the Delaware Guard, a private military company suspected of disloyalty. One of the officers, Thomas F. Bayard, the son of Senator James A. Bayard Jr., refused to surrender his weapon and was placed under arrest. Bayard was released under parole, but protested his arrest to du Pont, who told Bayard that "if the [Delaware Guard] had comported themselves as loyal citizens there would have been no occasion for their arrest."

Du Pont also continued his business activities during the Civil War, establishing new mills in California and buying supplies from Britain to meet the Union Army's demand for gunpowder. After the war, he continued to support the Republican Party, running as a Presidential elector in 1868, 1876, 1880, 1884, and 1888. The du Pont firm continued its growth after the war under his leadership, acquiring competitor firms and venturing into high explosives. Du Pont remained involved with the family business until his death in Wilmington on August 8, 1889, after a long illness.

== Marriage and family ==
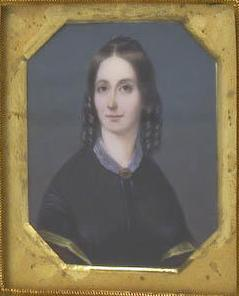
Louisa Gerhard du Pont

Henry du Pont married Louisa Gerhard du Pont (1816–1900) and had eight children, including:

- Henry Algernon du Pont (1838–1926)
- Ellen Eugenia du Pont Irving (1843–1907)
- Sara du Pont Duer (1847–1876)
- Victorine Elizabeth du Pont Foster (1849–1934)
- Sophie Madeleine du Pont Chandler (1851–1931), who married architect Theophilus P. Chandler Jr.
- William du Pont (1855–1928)
- Evelina du Pont (1840–1938)

== Sources ==
- Beach, Frederick Converse, ed. (1911). "Henry du Pont". The Americana: A Universal Reference Library. Vol. Biographies. New York: The Americana Company. pp. 132–133.
- Mitchell, Boadus (1930). "Henry du Pont". Dictionary of American Biography. Vol. V. New York: C. Scribner's Sons. pp. 528–529.
- Tansill, Charles Callan (1946). The Congressional Career of Thomas F. Bayard. Washington, D.C.: Georgetown University Press. OCLC 1518321.
