= Lammot du Pont II =

American heir and businessman

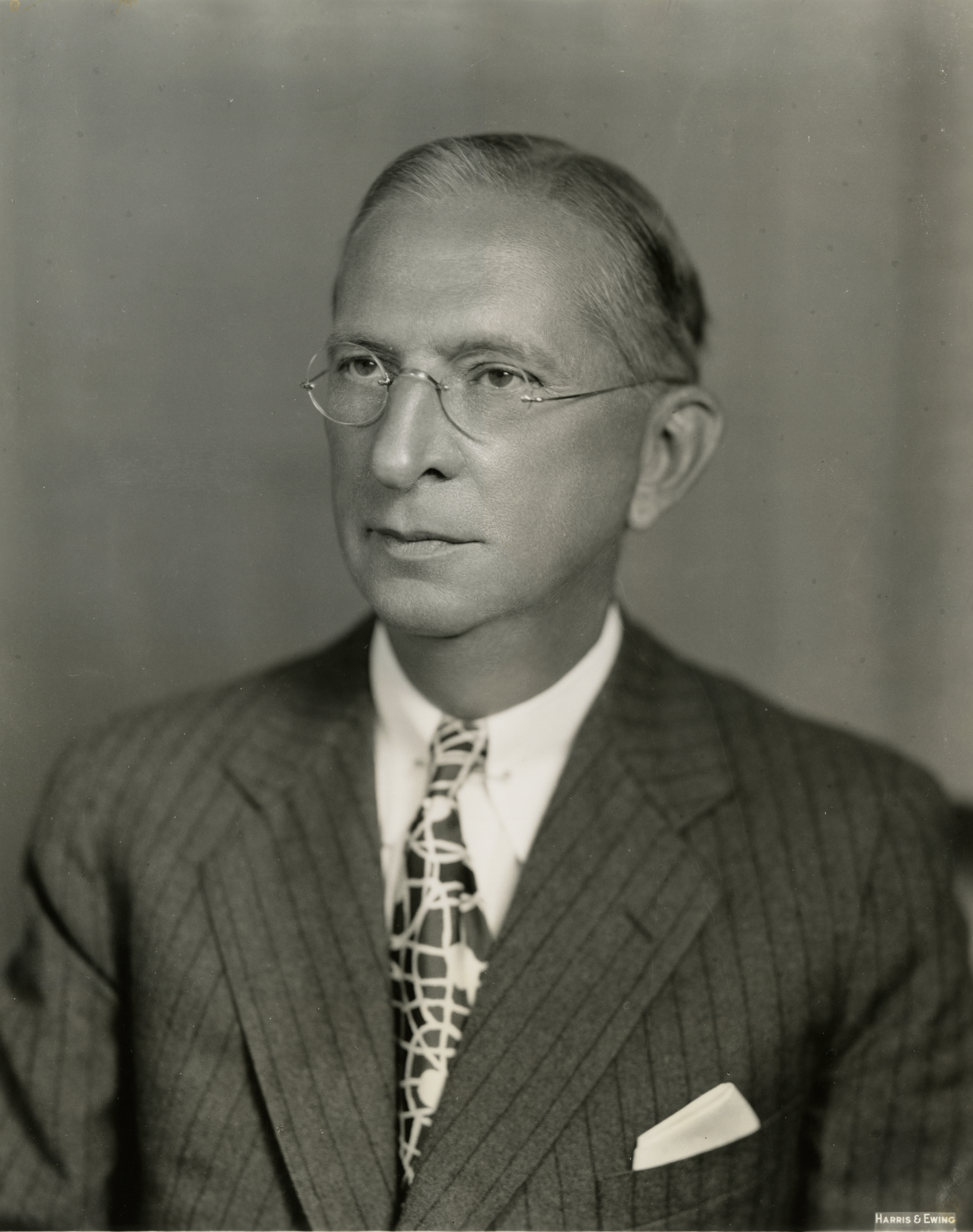
- Du Pont in 1941
- Born: October 12, 1880; Wilmington, Delaware, U.S.
- Died: July 24, 1952 (aged 71); New London, Connecticut, U.S.
- Occupation: Businessman
- Political party: Republican
- Board member of: E. I. du Pont de Nemours & Co., General Motors
- Spouses: Natalie Driver Wilson (1877–1918) (m. 1903; died 1918); Caroline H. Stollenwerck (m. 1930, divorced); Margaret A. Flett (d. 1968) (m. 1933)
- Children: 8, including Esther
- Father: Lammot du Pont
- Relatives: Pierre S. du Pont (brother); Irénée du Pont (brother)

Lammot du Pont II (October 12, 1880 – July 24, 1952) was an American businessman who was the head of the du Pont family's E. I. du Pont de Nemours and Company for 22 years.

== Early life ==
He was born on October 12, 1880, in Wilmington, Delaware. He was the ninth, and youngest boy, of eleven children born to chemist Lammot du Pont (1831–1884), and his wife, Mary (née Belin) du Pont (1839–1913). Among his siblings were brothers Pierre S. du Pont and Irénée du Pont, who were both involved in the Du Pont Company. His father died during a nitroglycerin explosion in 1884.

His maternal grandparents were Henry Hedrick Belin and Isabella (née d'Andelot) Belin and his paternal grandparents were Alfred Victor DuPont and Margaretta Elizabeth (née Lammot) DuPont. His was also a great-grandson of the French-born Éleuthère Irénée du Pont, the founder of E. I. du Pont de Nemours and Company.

== Career ==
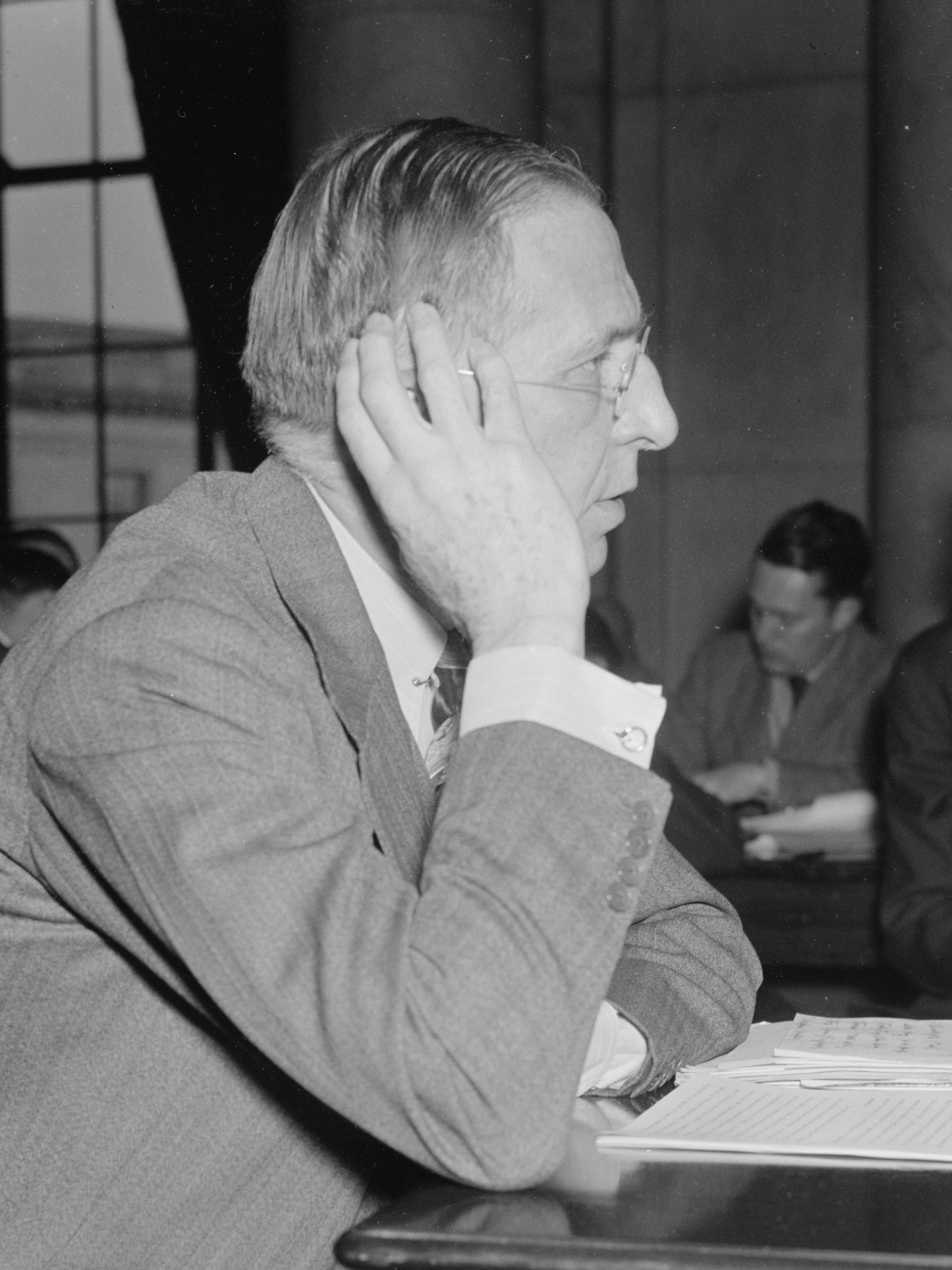
Du Pont at a U.S. Congressional committee hearing in 1938

On March 15, 1926, Lammot du Pont was elected President of E.I. du Pont de Nemours Co., succeeding elder brother Irénée du Pont, who was elected Chairman of the Board of Directors.

Lammot was president until May 20, 1940, when he was succeeded by Walter S. Carpenter Jr. At the same time, Lammot replaced another brother, Pierre S. du Pont, as chairman of the board.

== Personal life ==
Du Pont was married four times. His first marriage was on January 27, 1903, to Natalie Driver Wilson (1877–1918), at St. John's P. E. Church and officiated by Bishop Coleman. Natalie was a sister of Rodgers Wilson. Together, Lammot and Natalie were the parents of:

- Natalie Wilson du Pont (1904-1975), who married George P. Edmonds. They had two children, George, Jr. and Andrew.
- Mary Belin du Pont
- Esther Driver du Pont (1908–1984), who married Campbell Weir (1901–1982) in 1928. They divorced and she remarried to Sir John Rupert Hunt Thouron (1907–2007) in 1953.
- Lammot du Pont III (1909–1964), who married Mary Elizabeth Wooten (1916–1996) in 1950.
- Pierre Samuel du Pont III
- Edith du Pont
- Alexandrine du Pont (1915–1953), who married Howard A. Perkins (1906–1947) in 1937.
- Reynolds du Pont, a Republican state senator and president pro tem in Delaware who married Katherine Lewars.

His second marriage was to Caroline H. Stollenwerck in 1930. His third marriage was to Ruth Foster (1911–1958) in 1931.

In 1933, he married for the fourth and final time to Margaret A. Flett (d. 1968), the daughter of David H. Flett of Racine, Wisconsin. Together, they were the parents of one child:

- David Flett du Pont (1934–1955), who died at age twenty-one as a result of an automobile accident at Fishers Island, New York on September 2, 1955.

Du Pont died on July 24, 1952, in New London, Connecticut of heart disease at age 71.

=== Descendants ===
Through his son Reynolds, he was the grandfather of Natalie du Pont and Katharine du Pont, who married Peter Durant Sanger. After Sanger's death, she married Lewis Polk Rutherfurd, who was the widower of Janet Auchincloss Rutherfurd (half-sister of Jackie Kennedy and Lee Radziwill).
