= Alexis Irénée du Pont Jr. =

American business executive, member of the du Pont family

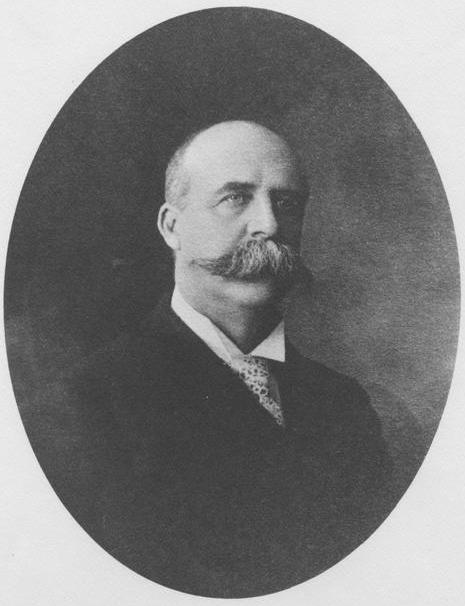
- Du Pont in 1890
- Born: June 5, 1843; New Castle County, Delaware
- Died: November 26, 1904 (aged 61); New Castle County, Delaware
- Education: University of Pennsylvania
- Occupations: Business executive, physician
- Father: Alexis Irénée du Pont
- Relatives: Francis Gurney du Pont (brother); Eugène du Pont (brother)

Alexis Irénée du Pont Jr. (June 5, 1843 – November 26, 1904) was an American business executive and non-practicing physician. He received his undergraduate and medical degrees from the University of Pennsylvania. Du Pont was a son of Alexis Irénée du Pont and grandson of Éleuthère Irénée du Pont, founder of E. I. du Pont de Nemours & Company.

== Early life and education ==
Born in New Castle County, Delaware, du Pont grew up with his maternal grandparents in Philadelphia. His father, Alexis Irénée du Pont, died in an accidental explosion in 1857. His mother was Joanna Maria Smith. He attended the Episcopal Academy and received his BA in 1863 and his MD in 1866 from the University of Pennsylvania. Instead of practicing medicine, he moved to Louisville, Kentucky, to join his cousins in a paper-making concern.

== Business career ==
Du Pont lived in Louisville for ten years before returning to his ancestral home in Wilmington, Delaware, in 1885. He moved to Brooklyn, New York, for three years to oversee his interests in the Brooklyn Street Railroad before returning to Wilmington. He then became a senior partner in the du Pont de Nemours Company and vice president of the Repauno Chemical Company, formed in 1880 to manufacture dynamite at a remote spot along the Delaware River in Gibbstown, New Jersey.

Following the death of his elder brother Eugène du Pont in 1902 and the takeover of the company by younger cousins, Alexis du Pont was offered the position of president of Repauno Chemical but declined due to failing kidney health. He died on November 26, 1904, at the age of 61 at his country home, Rencourt, outside Wilmington.

== Personal life ==
On February 5, 1867, du Pont married Margaretta Gilpin (1843–1868) of Wilmington. Left a widower a year later, he married Elizabeth Canby Bradford (1852–1925) of Wilmington on January 20, 1875. She was the daughter of U.S. district court judge Edward Green Bradford. While in Louisville, the couple had four children: Alice Eugenie du Pont Ortiz (1876–1940), Philip Francis du Pont (1878–1928), Elizabeth Bradford du Pont Bayard (1880–1975), and Eugene Eleuthère du Pont (1882–1966).
