= Victorine du Pont Bauduy =

American school superintendent and du Pont family member (1792–1861)

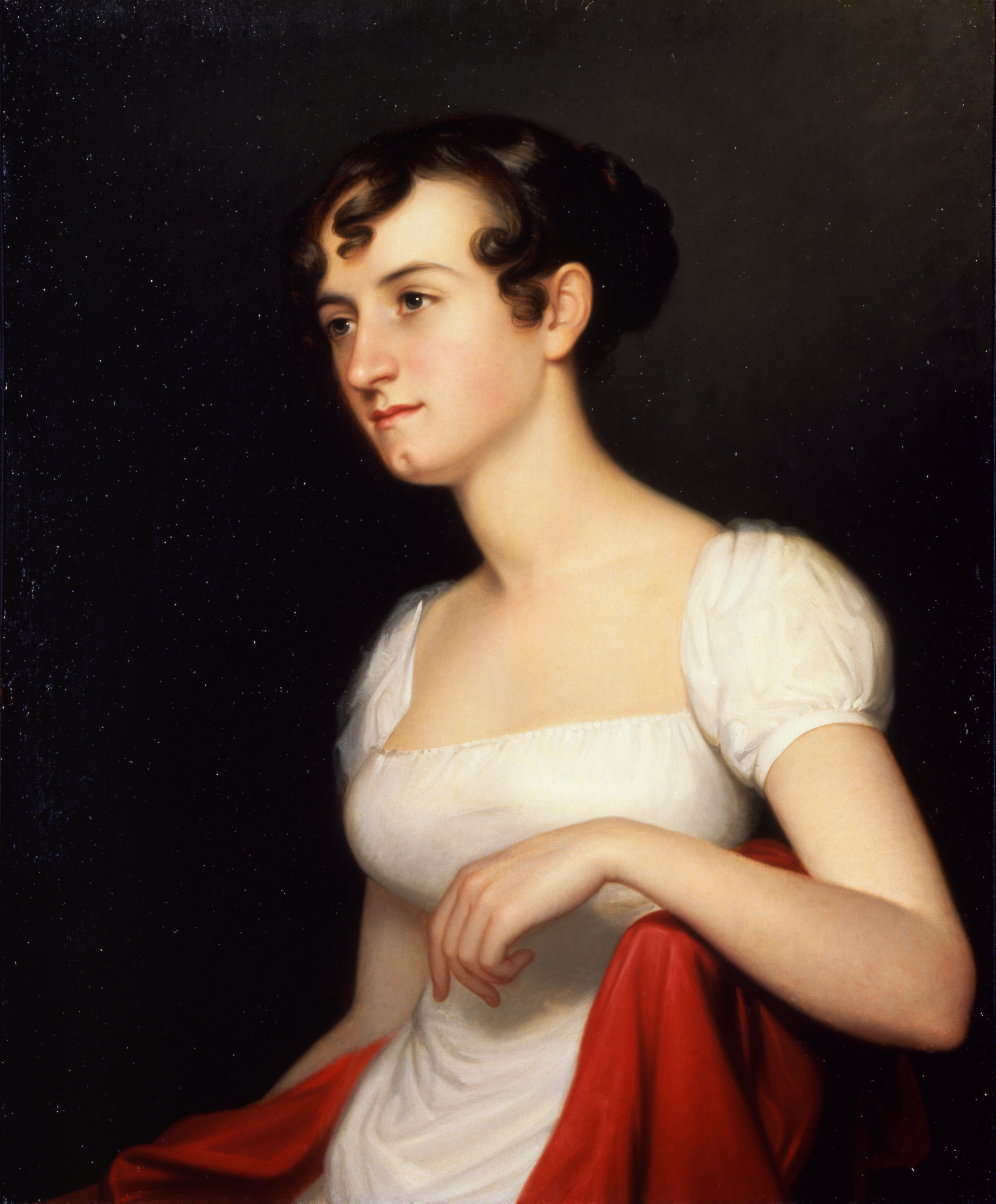
- Portrait of Victorine du Pont Bauduy by Rembrandt Peale in 1813
- Born: Victorine Elizabeth du Pont; 1792; Paris, France
- Died: 1861 (aged 68–69)
- Occupation(s): Educator, school superintendent
- Father: Éleuthère Irénée du Pont

Victorine Elizabeth du Pont Bauduy (1792–1861) was an American school superintendent and eldest daughter of Éleuthère Irénée du Pont (1771–1834), who founded E. I. du Pont de Nemours & Company, and of Sophie Madeleine Dalmas du Pont.

== Early life and education ==
Born in Paris in 1792, Victorine immigrated to America in 1800 and attended a New York school for French-speaking pupils. After the du Pont family moved to Delaware, she attended a Wilmington boarding school and then Madame Rivardi's Academy for Young Ladies in Philadelphia, along with her younger sister, Evelina (1796–1863), from 1805 to 1808. She studied reading, writing, spelling, mathematics, geography, French, history, needlework, drawing, dancing, music, and physical sciences.

Victorine became the first member of her family to learn English, and she influenced the du Pont family's Americanization. As her mother was ailing, she helped parent her younger siblings and home-schooled her siblings, nieces, and nephews.

== Marriage to Bauduy ==
Victorine married Ferdinand Bauduy, son of Peter Bauduy, her father's business partner, on November 9, 1813. Their fathers, who were increasingly estranged from each other, disapproved of the courtship and arranged for Ferdinand to return to France for two years. They remained devoted to each other and married when he returned. Ferdinand died of pneumonia less than three months after their marriage on January 21, 1814. Devastated by his untimely death, Victorine never remarried. The Hagley Museum and Library holds a volume of poems she wrote mourning her husband.

== Later life and career ==
At the encouragement of her father, Victorine became a teacher at the Brandywine Manufacturers' Sunday School, which her father sponsored to teach the children, many of them Irish immigrants, who worked at or lived near his gunpowder factory, along with children from neighboring farms. Hundreds of students passed through her school, which met only on Sundays because many of the pupils worked at the factory during the other six days of the week. Separate classes were held for the various Christian denominations. Victorine taught reading, writing, arithmetic, and the Bible and served as school superintendent from 1816 until her death in 1861. Her younger sister, Eleuthera du Pont Smith (1806–1876), taught at the school as well. The schoolhouse is located on Workers' Hill on the property of the Hagley Museum.

Victorine's papers and correspondence are held in the archives of the Hagley Museum and Library.
