= Louise E. du Pont Crowninshield =

American heiress and historic preservationist (1877–1958)

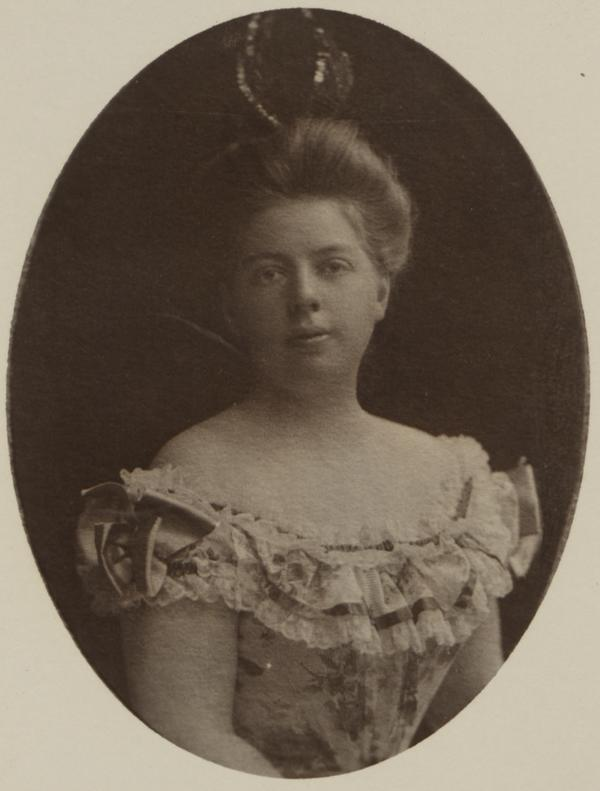
- Crowninshield circa 1900
- Born: August 3, 1877; Winterthur, Delaware, US
- Died: July 11, 1958 (aged 80); Wilmington, Delaware, US
- Known for: Historic preservation; founder of the Hagley Museum and Library
- Spouse: Francis Boardman Crowninshield (married 1900)
- Parent(s): Henry Algernon du Pont; Mary Pauline Foster du Pont
- Relatives: Henry Francis du Pont (brother)
- Family: du Pont family Crowninshield family

Louise Evelina du Pont Crowninshield (August 3, 1877 – July 11, 1958) was an American heiress, historic preservationist, and philanthropist. She was the great-granddaughter of Éleuthère Irénée du Pont, founder of E. I. du Pont de Nemours and Company. Her estate at Eleutherian Mills near Wilmington, Delaware, became the Hagley Museum and Library in 1957.

== Life and career ==
Louise du Pont was born on the Winterthur Estate to parents Henry Algernon du Pont and Mary Pauline Foster. She and her younger brother, Henry Francis du Pont, were their parents' only children who survived past infancy and therefore became the heirs to the du Pont fortune. A socialite who mingled in elite society in New York and Washington, DC, Louise du Pont married Boston Brahmin and professional yachtsman Francis Boardman Crowninshield on June 28, 1900. The couple split their time between Marblehead, Massachusetts; Boca Grande, Florida; and Eleutherian Mills near Wilmington, Delaware.

Passionate about historic preservation, Louise du Pont Crowninshield restored the du Pont family house at Eleutherian Mills, collected antiques and decorative arts, and planted gardens. She belonged to numerous historical societies and horticultural organizations. During the Truman administration, she served on the committee to redecorate the White House. She helped to restore and furnish the Dutch House and George Washington's birthplace at Wakefield House with period objects. She was a co-founder of the National Trust for Historic Preservation in 1949 and served as vice chair of the board in 1953. In the early 1950s, she was president of the National Council for Historic Sites and Buildings during its merger with the National Trust.

In recognition of her services to historic preservation, the National Trust instituted an annual award, the Louise Evelina du Pont Crowninshield Award. This award is the National Trust's highest national honor and is awarded only to those who have proven "superlative achievement over time in the preservation and interpretation of our cultural, architectural or maritime heritage."

== Personal life and death ==
Louise Crowninshield died on July 11, 1958, in Wilmington, Delaware. She was buried at Du Pont de Nemours Cemetery in New Castle County, Delaware. Her husband, Francis Crowninshield, had died in 1950, and the couple had no children. She was survived by her brother, Henry Francis du Pont, and by two nieces Pauline Louise and Ruth Ellen.

== Archival materials ==
Archival materials relating to Crowninshield are held in the permanent collections of the Hagley Museum and Library and the Winterthur Museum, Garden and Library.
