= Alexis Irénée du Pont =

American business executive and member of the du Pont family

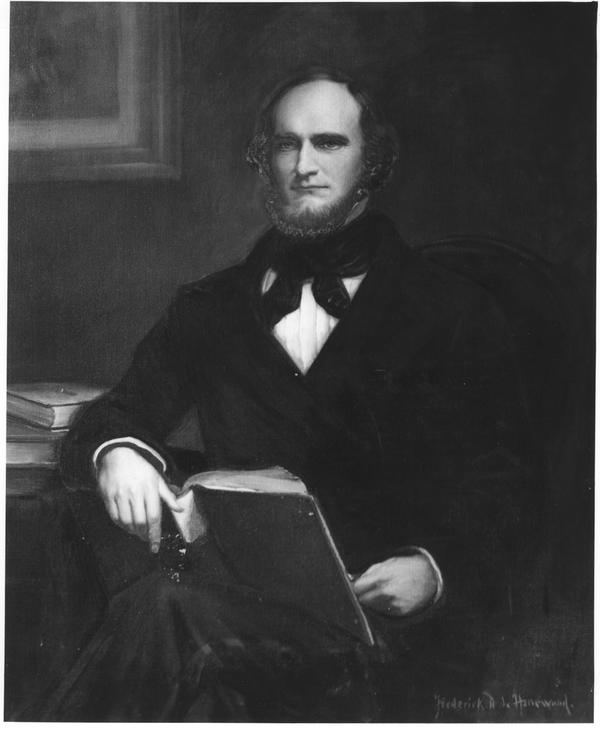
- Born: February 14, 1816; New Castle County, Delaware, US
- Died: August 23, 1857 (aged 41); New Castle County, Delaware
- Education: University of Pennsylvania
- Occupation: Business executive
- Employer: E. I. du Pont de Nemours & Co.
- Children: Francis Gurney du Pont, Eugène du Pont, Alexis Irénée du Pont Jr.
- Father: Éleuthère Irénée du Pont

Alexis Irénée du Pont (February 14, 1816 – August 23, 1857) was an American business executive who ran the Eleutherian Mills gunpowder factory in Delaware. He was fatally injured along with five of his employees in an accidental explosion at the powder mills. He was the youngest child of Éleuthère Irénée du Pont, founder of E. I. du Pont de Nemours & Company.

== Life and career ==
Born in New Castle County, Delaware, Alexis Irénée du Pont attended Mount Airy College in Germantown, Pennsylvania, and the New Haven Gymnasium in Connecticut from 1829 to 1831. Classmates included his nephew, James Irénée Bidermann, the only child of his father's business partner, Jacques Antoine Bidermann, and his sister, Evelina Gabrielle du Pont. Alexis Irénée completed scientific studies at the University of Pennsylvania from 1831 to 1835, though he never received his degree.

In December 1836, he married Joanna Maria Smith (1815–1876), daughter of Philadelphia merchant Francis Gurney Smith and sister of physician Thomas Mackie Smith, who had recently married Alexis Irénée's sister, Eleuthera du Pont Smith. Alexis Irénée and Joanna had eight children, including Francis Gurney du Pont, Eugène du Pont, and Alexis Irénée du Pont Jr.

Alexis Irénée du Pont became a partner in E. I. du Pont de Nemours & Company in 1837 and continued in this capacity until his death on August 23, 1857, having been fatally injured in an explosion at the powder mills a day earlier.

He is the namesake of A.I. duPont Middle School and A.I. duPont High School.
