= Jacques Antoine Bidermann =

French-American businessman (1790–1865)

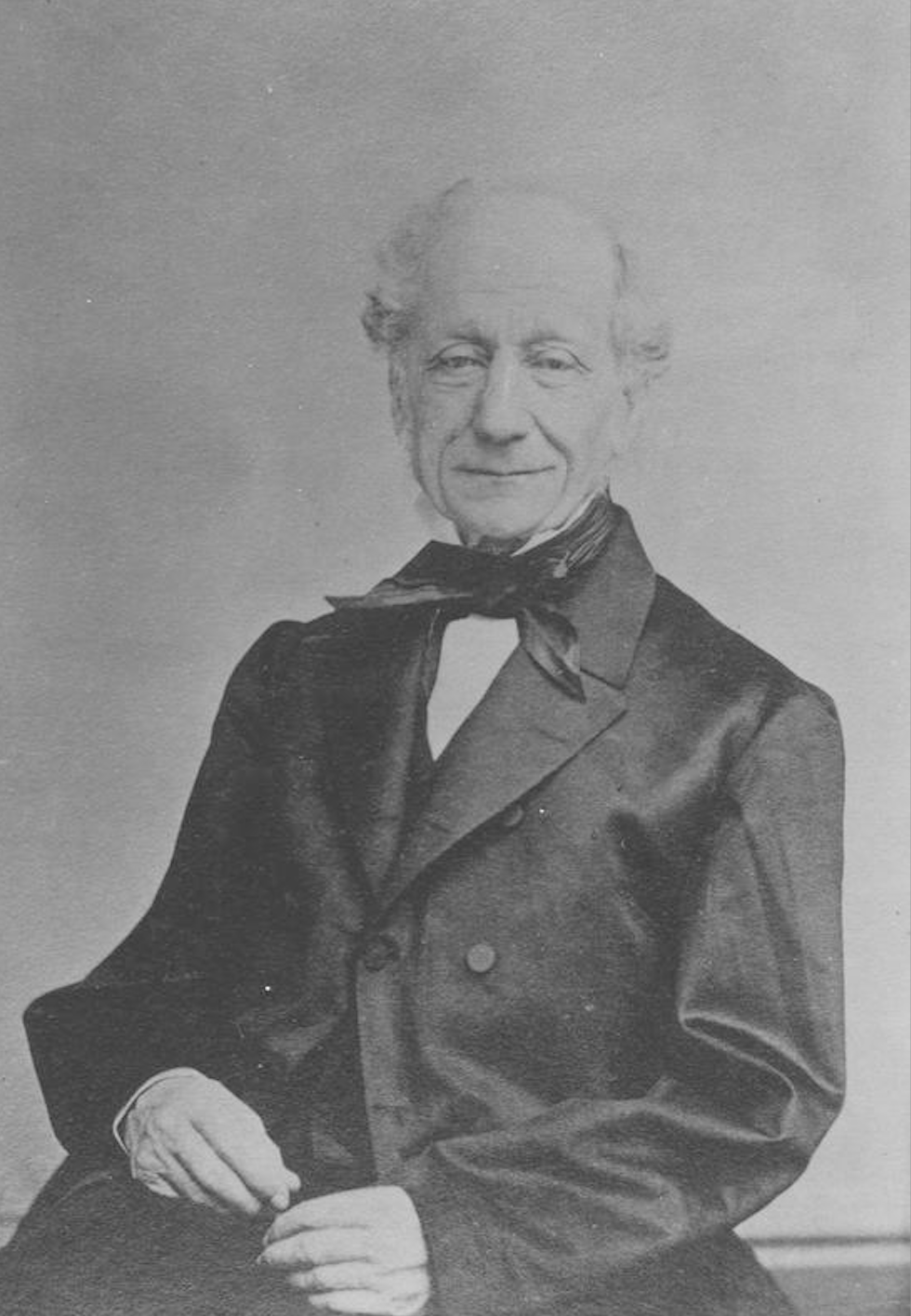
- Bidermann circa 1850
- Born: April 17, 1790; Paris, France
- Died: July 8, 1865 (aged 75); Paris, France
- Other names: James Antoine Bidermann
- Citizenship: French, Swiss, American
- Occupation: Businessman
- Employer: E. I. du Pont de Nemours & Co.
- Known for: Founder of Winterthur
- Spouse: Evelina Gabrielle du Pont (married 1815)
- Children: 1 (James Irénée Bidermann)
- Relatives: Éleuthère Irénée du Pont (father-in-law)

Jacques Antoine Bidermann (April 17, 1790 – June 8, 1865), also known as James Antoine Bidermann, was an American businessman of French and Swiss origins who became the business partner and son-in-law of Éleuthère Irénée du Pont. He married into the Du Pont family and founded the estate that later became the Winterthur Museum, Garden and Library.

== Early life and family ==
Bidermann was born in Paris in 1790 to Swiss parents Jacques André Bidermann and Gabrielle Aimée Odier. His father was a millionaire financier whose ancestors had established themselves in Winterthur, Switzerland, in the sixteenth century. Culturally French and Protestant, the senior Bidermann became a French citizen in 1790 and flourished in the good graces of Republican and Napoleonic regimes. In 1791, he loaned almost six million francs to the Republic and loaned another four million francs to Napoleon in 1804. To protect his young son from the tumult of the Republican period, he sent Antoine home to the family estate in Winterthur, where he spent his boyhood. Antoine returned to Paris by 1804 and went to work for his father's business.

== Du Pont partnership ==
The senior Bidermann owned one-third of all shares in Du Pont de Nemours, a company formed by Pierre Samuel du Pont to develop land in the United States. In 1801, Bidermann and other French investors funded son Éleuthère Irénée du Pont's new gunpowder factory on Brandywine Creek in Delaware. However, the elder du Pont's branch of the company failed in 1811, and the younger du Pont failed to produce dividends for his shareholders. In 1814, the French investors sent Antoine Bidermann to investigate, bearing letters of introduction from the Marquis de Lafayette to Thomas Jefferson and Bushrod Washington.

Bidermann examined du Pont's accounts and cleared the company of any fraud or mismanagement. In short order, he became du Pont's trusted business partner and son-in-law. Bidermann had landed in Wilmington, Delaware, in August 1814. By the end of the following year, he had bought out the stake of Pierre Bauduy de Bellevue (an early partner in du Pont's gunpowder operation who had spread rumors of du Pont's defaulting on his debts) and married E. I. du Pont's daughter, Evelina Gabrielle (born in Paris in 1796; married on September 14, 1815; died in 1863). Evelina and Antoine Bidermann resided at Hagley House (on the grounds of the future Hagley Museum and Library), where their only child, James Irénée, was born in 1817.

As his father-in-law's sole business partner from 1815 to 1834, Bidermann oversaw the accounts, purchased supplies, arranged sales, and managed personnel. He inherited his father's shares in 1817, expanding his stake in the company. He ran the entire business between 1828, when E. I. du Pont's wife Sophie died, and 1834, when E. I. du Pont followed her to the grave. E. I. du Pont de Nemours & Company was then producing nearly one million pounds of gunpowder annually. After their father's death, the seven du Pont heirs asked Bidermann to serve as CEO and train Alfred V. du Pont to lead the company. Bidermann paid off the company's debts and bought out the French shareholders, making the du Pont family the full owners. In 1837, Bidermann retired in favor of Alfred, planning to live off the substantial income generated by his and his wife's shares.

== Winterthur estate ==
On April 4, 1837, Bidermann purchased from the du Pont heirs a 450-acre tract in northwestern Delaware, which E. I. du Pont had acquired between 1810 and 1818 and used for sheep grazing and fodder. For the ensuing quarter century, Bidermann's occupation was one of a gentleman farmer. He constructed a three-story Greek Revival mansion of his own design, planted extensive gardens and orchards, bred livestock, and developed a model farm and dairy. He was active in the day-to-day management of the farm, often rising before dawn to oversee the morning chores. No later than 1842, he named his estate "Winterthur" after his childhood and ancestral home in Switzerland.

Like his du Pont relatives, Bidermann was a staunch Whig and Union supporter. His wife's favorite riding horse was named Henry Clay, in honor of the Kentucky senator.

Bidermann's health began to fail in the late 1850s, obliging him to rent out parts of the farm. After his wife Evelina died on March 19, 1863, he left Winterthur to reside with his son's family in France. Bidermann died in Paris on June 8, 1865. E. I. du Pont de Nemours and Company owed its early success in no small part to his leadership.

The Winterthur estate passed to Bidermann's son, James Irénée Bidermann, who had attended the École Polytechnique, married a Frenchwoman in 1844, and chosen not to return to America. James sold the Winterthur Estate to Henry du Pont, who intended it as a domicile for his eldest son, Henry Algernon. Passed down through the family, the estate became the Winterthur Museum, Garden and Library in 1952 and "houses one of the nation's outstanding collections of furniture and the decorative arts."
