= Alfred du Pont =

Alfred du Pont may refer to:

- Alfred I. du Pont (Alfred Irénée du Pont, 1864–1935), American industrialist, financier, philanthropist
- Alfred V. du Pont (Alfred Victor Philadelphe du Pont de Nemours, 1798–1856), French American chemist and industrialist
