= Irénée du Pont =

American businessman (1876–1963)

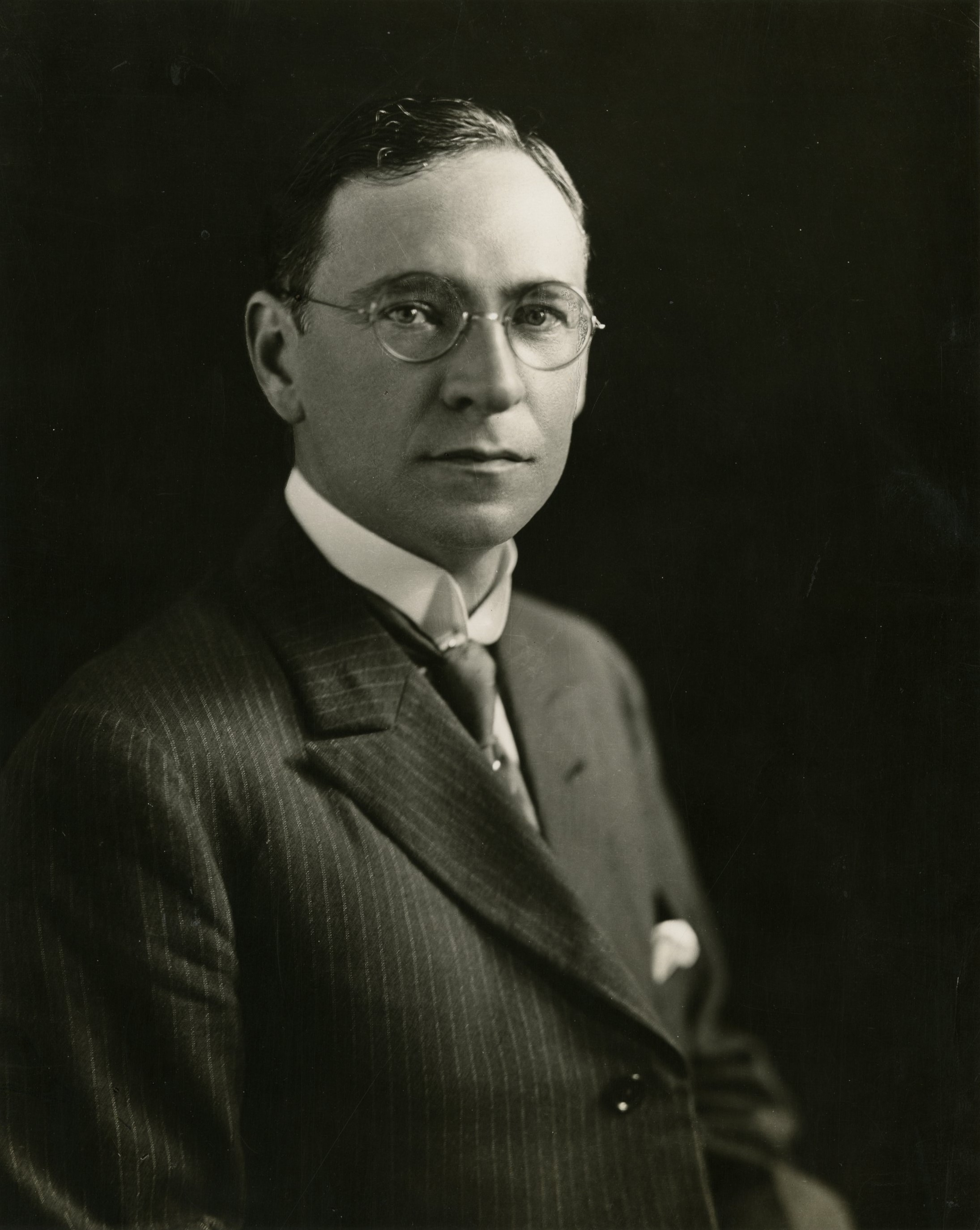
- Du Pont c. 1919
- Born: December 21, 1876; New Castle, Delaware, U.S.
- Died: December 19, 1963 (aged 86); Wilmington, Delaware, U.S.
- Education: Massachusetts Institute of Technology (BS, MS)
- Political party: Republican
- Spouse: Irene du Pont
- Children: 9
- Parent: Lammot du Pont (father)
- Relatives: Pierre S. du Pont and Lammot du Pont II (brothers)

Irénée du Pont I (December 21, 1876 – December 19, 1963) was an American businessman, president of the DuPont company, and head of the Du Pont trust.

== Early life and education ==
Irénée du Pont I was born on December 21, 1876, in New Castle, Delaware, the son of Mary Belin and Lammot du Pont I, and a descendant of DuPont founder Éleuthère Irénée du Pont. When he was eight years old, his father was killed in an explosion at the DuPont works in Repauno, New Jersey.

He graduated from the William Penn Charter School in 1892 before attending Phillips Academy for a year, graduating in 1894, and the Massachusetts Institute of Technology (MIT) in 1897. He received his master's degree in chemical engineering from MIT a year after graduation. While at MIT, he was a member of the Phi Beta Epsilon fraternity.

== Career ==
He worked for Fenn's Manufacturing Contracting Company for a number of years before he joined DuPont in 1903. du Pont first worked in the organization of a construction division in black powder, then worked as assistant treasurer, assistant to the general manager and manager of the developmental department. By the start of World War I he was the vice president, and he was named the chairman of the executive committee a year later.

He was the elected president of DuPont from 1919 to 1925, where he oversaw the dismantling of the company's war productions from the First World War. At the time of his death, he was credited with being responsible for the shift of the company from being solely dependent on explosives, to being a more diverse industrial company. He oversaw DuPont at a time when three workers were fatally poisoned with tetraethyl lead. In the 1920s and 1930s, the DuPont company also supported German rearmament and worked with the German chemicals conglomerate IG Farben.

He retired from the board of directors of DuPont in 1958.

== Personal life ==
Du Pont married a second cousin of his, Irene Sophie du Pont, and had nine children with her: eight daughters and a son.

Du Pont built a mansion in Varadero, Cuba, which he named Xanadu. In 1957, Fortune estimated his wealth at between $200 million and $400 million, making him one of the two richest members of the Du Pont family at that time, and one of the twenty richest Americans (see Wealthiest Americans (1957)).

Du Pont, a registered Republican, supported the repeal of Prohibition but was an opponent of the New Deal left-wing agenda of President Franklin Roosevelt. Du Pont was also a founder of the American Liberty League. In 1933, Irénée du Pont is rumored to have been one of the forces behind the Business Plot.

He died on December 19, 1963, in Wilmington, Delaware.
