= Amy Elizabeth du Pont =

American philanthropist (1875-1962)

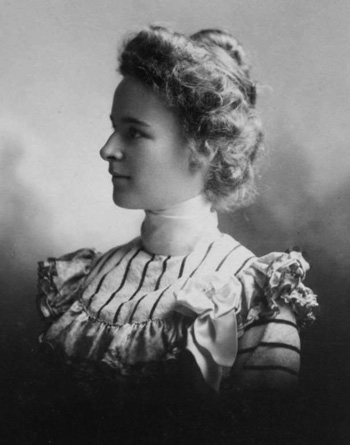
- Du Pont in 1895
- Born: August 7, 1875; Wilmington, Delaware, US
- Died: February 16, 1962 (aged 86); Montecito, California, US
- Resting place: Santa Barbara Cemetery
- Occupation(s): Heiress, philanthropist
- Parents: Eugène du Pont (father); Amélia Elizabeth du Pont (mother)

Amélia "Amy" Elizabeth du Pont (August 7, 1875 – February 16, 1962) was a philanthropist and prominent member of the Du Pont family of American industrialists.

== Family ==
She was born on August 7, 1880, the fifth of six children born to Eugène du Pont, grandson of DuPont founder Éleuthère Irénée du Pont (1771–1834). Eugène was the first head of the modern DuPont corporation, seeing the corporation into the 20th century.

Amy's mother and namesake, Amélia Elizabeth du Pont, was also born a du Pont, granddaughter of Charles I. du Pont (1797–1869), nephew of Éleuthère Irénée.

In his will, Eugène provided equally for his children, but the portions for Amy and her sisters were held in trust for them, while their brothers received their inheritance outright.

Known as "Miss Amy", she never married.

An ardent horsewoman, she was injured in a fall from a horse in 1954 that restricted her activities. She died on February 16, 1962, at age 86, following a stroke at her home in Montecito, near Santa Barbara. She was buried at Santa Barbara Cemetery.

== Philanthropy ==
Du Pont was a major benefactor of the University of Delaware. She served on the University of Delaware Board of Trustees' Advisory Committee on the Women's College from 1939–1944.

In 1939, she and her attorney, Judge Hugh M. Morris, founded the Unidel Foundation, a private charitable organization whose mission is "to aid and promote higher education in the State of Delaware, and to increase, enlarge and improve the scientific and educational advantages and opportunities of its people by gifts and contributions [to the university]." Without any children, Amy willed much of her inheritance to the Unidel Foundation, including DuPont and Hercules Inc. stock valued at some $25 million at her death in 1962. The first major project was to renovate the Carpenter Sports Building, named in honor of du Pont's cousin R. R. M. Carpenter (1877–1949), a DuPont executive, owner of the Philadelphia Phillies and long-time benefactor for the university's athletic department. By the end of the 20th century, Unidel provided more than $112 million to university programs.

In 1973, the Unidel Foundation helped build the Amy E. du Pont Music Building in her honor. It houses the university's department of music.
