= Pierre S. du Pont =

American businessman (1870–1954)

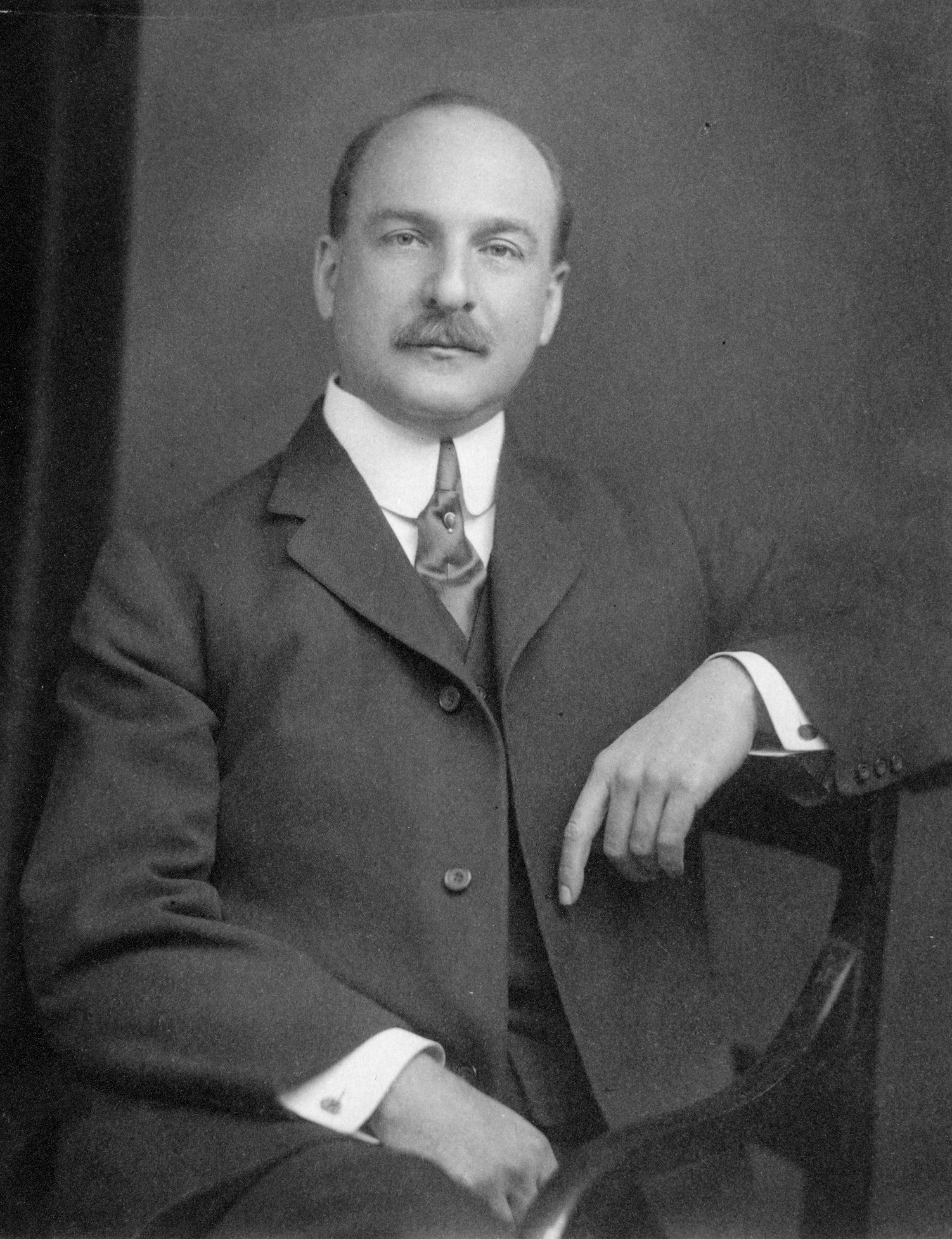
- du Pont in January 1910

President of General Motors
- In office 1920–1923
- Preceded by: William C. Durant
- Succeeded by: Alfred P. Sloan Jr.

Personal details
- Born: Pierre Samuel du Pont; January 15, 1870 Wilmington, Delaware, U.S.
- Died: April 4, 1954 (aged 84) Wilmington, Delaware, U.S.
- Resting place: Du Pont de Nemours Cemetery
- Spouse: Alice Belin (m. 1915; died 1944)
- Relations: Irénée du Pont; Lammot du Pont II; (brothers)
- Parent(s): Lammot du Pont; Mary Belin du Pont
- Education: Massachusetts Institute of Technology
- Occupation: Businessman, philanthropist

Pierre Samuel du Pont (/duːˈpɒnt/; January 15, 1870 – April 4, 1954) was an American entrepreneur, businessman, philanthropist and member of the prominent du Pont family.

He was president of DuPont from 1915 to 1919, and was on its board of directors until 1940. He also managed General Motors from 1915 to 1920, became GM's president in 1920, and was on GM's board of directors until 1928. Among other notable accomplishments, he was among the founding board of directors of the Empire State Building which opened in 1931.

== Early life ==
Du Pont was born January 15, 1870, on the family estate near Wilmington, Delaware, and was named after his great-great-grandfather, Pierre Samuel du Pont de Nemours. He was the eldest of three sons born to Lammot du Pont and Mary Belin.

His great-great-grandfather, and namesake, was a French economist (who had been granted the ennobling suffix "de Nemours" after election to the Constituent Assembly) and patriarch of the du Pont family. Du Pont de Nemours immigrated to America with relatives including his son, Eleuthère Irénée du Pont, who founded the DuPont company in 1802, and whose descendants would form one of the richest American business dynasties of the ensuing two centuries.

In 1884 his father was killed in an industrial accident. As the eldest son of ten children, at 14 years old, he was patriarch of the family. For the rest of their lives, his siblings, even his older sisters, addressed him as "Dad" or "Daddy." In 1890, he graduated from MIT with a degree in chemistry.

== Career ==
Following graduation from MIT in 1890, he became assistant superintendent at Eleutherian Mills on the Brandywine River.

He and his cousin Francis Gurney du Pont developed the first American smokeless powder in 1892 at the Carney's Point plant in New Jersey.

Most of the 1890s he spent working with the management at a steel firm partly owned by DuPont (primarily by T. Coleman du Pont), the Johnson Street Rail Company in Johnstown, Pennsylvania. Here he learned to deal with money from the company's president, Arthur Moxham. In 1899, unsatisfied with how conservative DuPont's management was, he quit and took over the Johnson Company. In 1901, while du Pont was supervising the integrating of Johnson Company assets in Lorain, Ohio into U. S. Steel, he employed John J. Raskob as a private secretary, beginning a long and profitable business and personal relationship between the two.

=== Expansion of DuPont ===
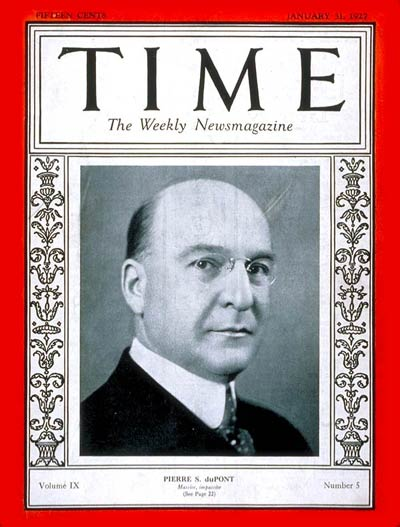
du Pont on the cover of the January 31, 1927 issue of TIME magazine

He and his cousins, Alfred I. du Pont and T. Coleman du Pont, purchased E. I. du Pont de Nemours and Company in 1902, in order to keep the company in family hands, after the death of its president, Eugene I. du Pont. They set about buying smaller powder firms. Until 1914, during Coleman du Pont's illness, Pierre du Pont served as treasurer, executive vice-president, and acting president.

In 1915, a group headed by Pierre, which included outsiders, bought Coleman's stock. Alfred was offended and sued Pierre for breach of trust.

Pierre was DuPont's president until 1919. Pierre gave the DuPont company a modern management structure and modern accounting policies and made the concept of return on investment primary. During World War I, the company grew very quickly due to advance payments on Allied munition contracts. He also established many other DuPont interests in other industries.

He was featured on the cover of Time magazine's January 31, 1927, issue. That same year he was elected an honorary member of the Delaware Society of the Cincinnati. In 1930, he was elected a director of the Pennsylvania Railroad.

=== General Motors ===
In 1915, Du Pont was elected a director of General Motors. where he was a significant figure in the success of the company and was noted for building a sizeable personal investment in the company as well as supporting John J. Raskob's proposal for DuPont to invest in the automobile company.

In 1920, he became president of General Motors succeeding William C. Durant, and resigned in 1923, when he was succeeded by Alfred P. Sloan Jr. Pierre du Pont became chairman of GM, but resigned in response to Sloan's dispute with Raskob over the latter's involvement with the Democratic National Committee. When du Pont retired from its board of directors, GM was the largest company in the world.

=== DuPont and MIT ===
Du Pont was one of the first of many of his family members to attend the Massachusetts Institute of Technology. Both his younger brothers, Irénée du Pont (1897) and Lammot du Pont II (1901), graduated from MIT. Du Pont, his relations and the DuPont corporation were generous benefactors over the years, and helped set up multiple endowments, fellowships, scholarships and faculty chairs for the university. When MIT moved to its current location in Cambridge in 1917, Pierre, T. Coleman du Pont and Charles Hayden donated $215,000 to house the Department of Mining, Engineering and Metallurgy (now the Department of Materials Science and Engineering).

Du Pont was on multiple boards and committees, and from 1916 to 1951 he was a member of the MIT Corporation, the university's board of trustees. Along with his brother Lammot, he was given the honor of being made a life member emeritus when he stepped down from the board in 1951.

In 2000, the DuPont MIT Alliance (DMA) was formed. Over the next 10 years, the DuPont corporation donated $55 million to the university to fund as many as 20 different research projects.

=== Later life ===
Pierre retired from DuPont's board in 1940. He also was on the Delaware State Board of Education and donated millions to Delaware's public schools, financing the replacement of Delaware's dilapidated Negro schools.

In 1943, his genealogical research book, Genealogy of the Du Pont family, 1739–1942, was published.

== Personal life ==
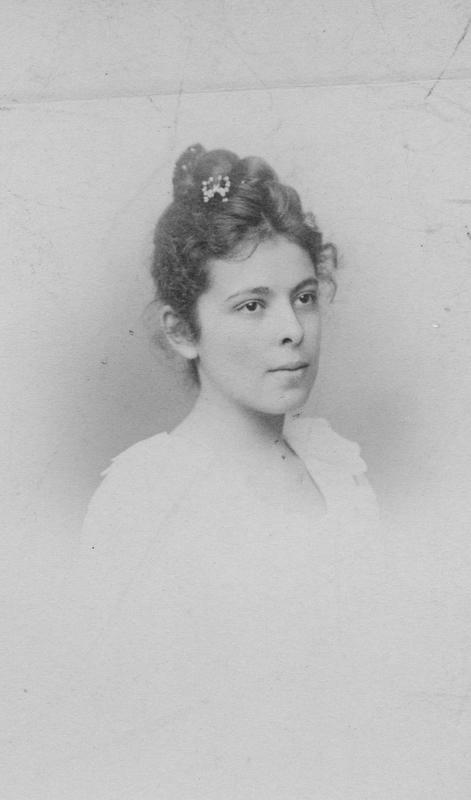
du Pont married Alice Belin Du Pont, his first cousin, in 1915; she died in 1944.

He was a bachelor until age 45. On October 16, 1915, after the death of his mother, he married his first cousin Alice Belin (1872–1944), a daughter of his uncle, Henry Belin Jr., from Scranton, Pennsylvania. The ceremony was at 400 Park Avenue in Manhattan, the home of her brother, his first cousin, F. Lammot Belin. They were married in New York City because Pennsylvania law prohibited first cousins from marrying. They had no children.

Alice died at Longwood, their estate near Kennett Square, Pennsylvania, on June 23, 1944.

Du Pont died nearly ten years later on April 4, 1954, at Memorial Hospital in Wilmington, Delaware. After a funeral held at Longwood, he was buried in the Du Pont family cemetery near the Brandywine River.

=== Legacy ===
External videos
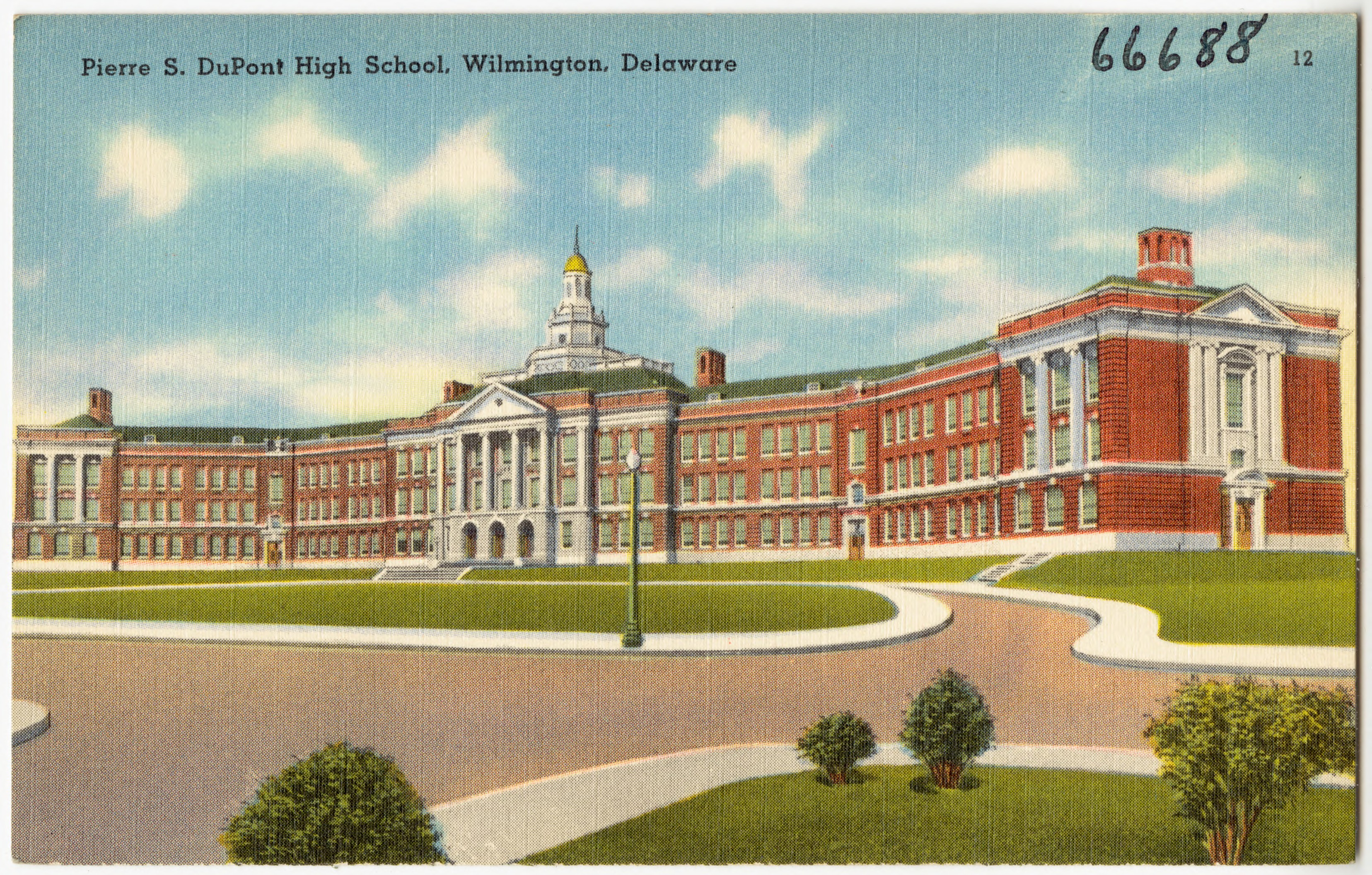
- A Separate Place: The Schools That P.S. du Pont Built (short version), 26:00, Hagley Museum and Library

Du Pont was elected to the American Philosophical Society in 1917. In 1919 du Pont became a member of the Delaware board of education, becoming president in the 1920s. At the time, state law prohibited money raised from white taxpayers from being used to support the state's schools for black children. Appalled by the condition of the black schools, du Pont donated four million dollars to construct eighty-six new school buildings. By 1927, it was reported that he had provided school buildings for 43% of Delaware's schoolchildren. In 1925 he became Delaware's tax commissioner, and used his position to modernize the tax office and ensure tax collection.

In 1927, du Pont became the president of the Association Against the Prohibition Amendment. He and his family were among the major donors to the group.

Du Pont is known for opening the grounds of his estate to the public as Longwood Gardens. Its construction was inspired by his international travels, visiting the gardens of the world.

The former P. S. Dupont High School in Wilmington, now a middle school, is named in his honor. A building at the University of Delaware, Du Pont Hall, is also named for him. It houses the offices and laboratories for the College of Engineering. Du Pont also donated $900,000 towards the construction and establishment of Kennett High School in 1924, equal to over $12.8M today.

In 1942, a Liberty ship was named for him. It was launched on 27 August 1942 and survived World War II. The ship suffered a cracked hull in 1948, but was repaired and remained in the National Defense Reserve Fleet until being scrapped in 1971.

== Published works ==
- Pierre S. Du Pont (1943). Genealogy of the Du Pont family, 1739-1942. Wilmington, Delaware, US: Hambleton. hdl:2027/wu.89082418435. OCLC 609194857.

== See also ==
- Du Pont family
- P. S. Dupont High School
- Ross Point School

Business positions
Preceded by Thomas Neal	Chairman of General Motors; 1915–1929	Succeeded by Lammot du Pont II
Preceded by William C. Durant	President of General Motors; 1920–1923	Succeeded by Alfred P. Sloan Jr.
