= Francis Gurney du Pont =

American chemist, inventor of smokeless gunpowder, and member of the du Pont family

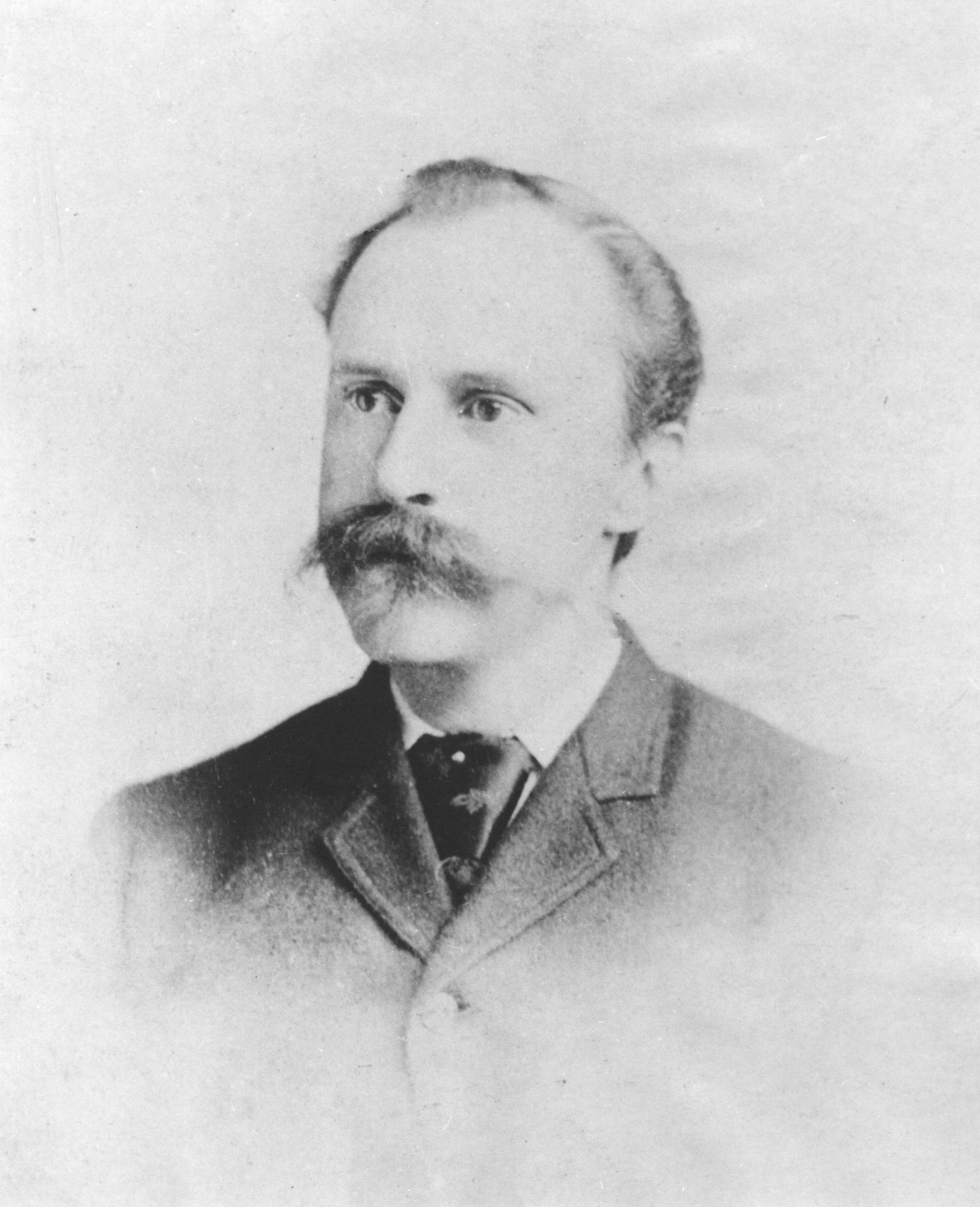
- Born: May 27, 1850; New Castle County, Delaware, US
- Died: November 7, 1904 (aged 54); Wilmington, Delaware, US
- Education: University of Pennsylvania
- Occupations: Inventor, businessman
- Spouse: Elise Wigfall Simons
- Children: E. Paul du Pont
- Father: Alexis Irénée du Pont

Francis Gurney du Pont (May 27, 1850 – November 7, 1904) was an American businessman and chemist who was a vice president of E. I. du Pont de Nemours Company and invented smokeless gunpowder with the assistance of cousin Pierre S. du Pont. A member of the du Pont family, Francis had ten children, including E. Paul du Pont, founder of Du Pont Motors.

== Biography ==
Francis du Pont was the youngest son of Alexis Irénée du Pont and a grandson of Éleuthère Irénée du Pont. Born in New Castle County, Delaware, he received a bachelor's degree in chemistry from the University of Pennsylvania in 1870.

Joining the du Pont de Nemours Company as partner in 1873, Francis du Pont ran the Upper and Lower Hagley Yards and rose to become one of three vice presidents of the firm. In 1893, he and Pierre S. du Pont patented a solvent recovery process for the production of smokeless gunpowder. He ran the plant at Carney's Point, New Jersey, that made smokeless powder.

On the death of his older brother and company president Eugène du Pont in 1902, Francis du Pont wanted to sell the firm to competitor Laflin & Rand. He distrusted modern business practices that he feared the younger generation would implement at the firm. He lost control to the company to cousins Alfred I. du Pont, T. Coleman du Pont, and Pierre S. du Pont in 1902.

In 1871, du Pont married Elise Wigfall Simons (1849–1919). The couple had ten children. He died in 1904 in Wilmington, Delaware, at the age of 54.
