= New Haven Gymnasium =

Defunct school in Connecticut, US

New Haven Gymnasium was a brief-lived boarding school for boys in New Haven, Connecticut, founded on the German plan by two sons of Timothy Dwight, Sereno Edwards Dwight (1786-1850) and Henry Edwin Dwight (1797-1832). Henry had become an admirer of the German education system during two years study in Germany, at the Universities of Gottingen and Berlin, and following his return from Germany a prospectus for the school was issued in 1827, and the New Haven Gymnasium opened in 1828. The school closed in 1831 due to the poor health of the Dwight brothers, and Henry Dwight died in 1832.

Stiles French was employed there as a mathematics instructor, and following its closure joined the Round Hill School, which was also operating on the German model. He later returned to New Haven to found the New Haven Collegiate and Commercial Institute.
