= Alfred V. du Pont =

American chemist and industrialist

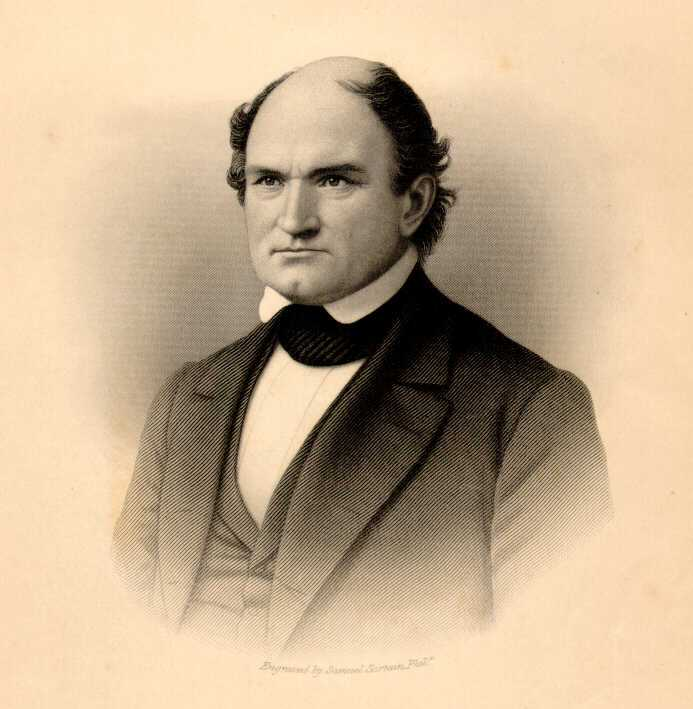
- Born: Alfred Victor Philadelphe du Pont de Nemours; April 11, 1798; Paris, France
- Died: October 4, 1856 (aged 58); Greenville, Delaware
- Spouse: Margaretta Elizabeth La Motte
- Children: Victorine Elizabeth du Pont; Emma Paulina du Pont; Eleuthère Irénée du Pont II; Lammot du Pont; Alfred Victor du Pont; Mary Sophie du Pont; Antoine Biderman du Pont
- Parent(s): Éleuthère Irénée du Pont, Sophie Madeleine Dalmas du Pont

Alfred Victor Philadelphe du Pont de Nemours (April 11, 1798 – October 4, 1856) was a French American chemist and industrialist, who was the eldest son and successor of Éleuthère Irénée du Pont, the founder of the E.I. du Pont de Nemours and Company. His son, Alfred Victor du Pont, was one of founding fathers of the alpha (first) chapter of Phi Kappa Sigma fraternity on October 19, 1850, affiliated with University of Pennsylvania, which is a charter member of the North American Interfraternity Conference.

== Early life and family ==
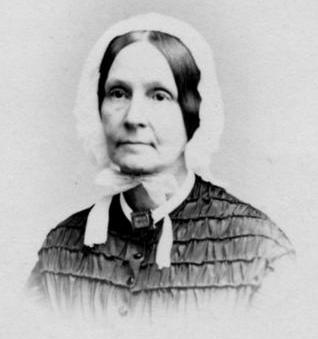
Margaretta Elizabeth (Lammot) du Pont

Du Pont was born in Paris, son of Éleuthère Irénée du Pont and Sophie Madeleine Dalmas du Pont. He came to the United States in 1800 as an infant and grew up around the gunpowder mills founded by his father on the Brandywine Creek in Delaware. Later he attended Mount Airy College, in Germantown, Pennsylvania, and then studied chemistry at Dickinson College. While there he was president of Belles Lettres Literary Society and became a friend of one of his professors, Thomas Cooper. He later became Cooper's assistant at the University of Pennsylvania. Du Pont married American Margaretta Elizabeth "Molly" La Motte (or Lammot) in 1824; they had seven children.

== Company ==
In 1818, du Pont returned home to help his father rebuild the gunpowder company after an explosion that killed 33 people and injured his mother. He worked closely with the men in the mills and was particularly interested in researching new gunpowder chemical developments. The laboratory was his home. After nearly 20 years as a "powderman" and after a reorganization of the partnership by Jacques Antoine Bidermann, he became head of the company in 1837. It was a difficult role for him, and after leading the company through a recovery from a disastrous mill explosion in 1847, he retired in poor health in 1850.

== Death and legacy ==
Alfred du Pont died October 4, 1856, at Eleutherian Mills, near Greenville, Delaware, and is buried in the du Pont de Nemours Cemetery near Greenville.

His son, Alfred Victor du Pont, founder of Phi Kappa Sigma with six others in 1850.

== See also ==
- Hagley Museum and Library
