= Lammot du Pont I =

US chemist, heir, and businessman (1831–1884)

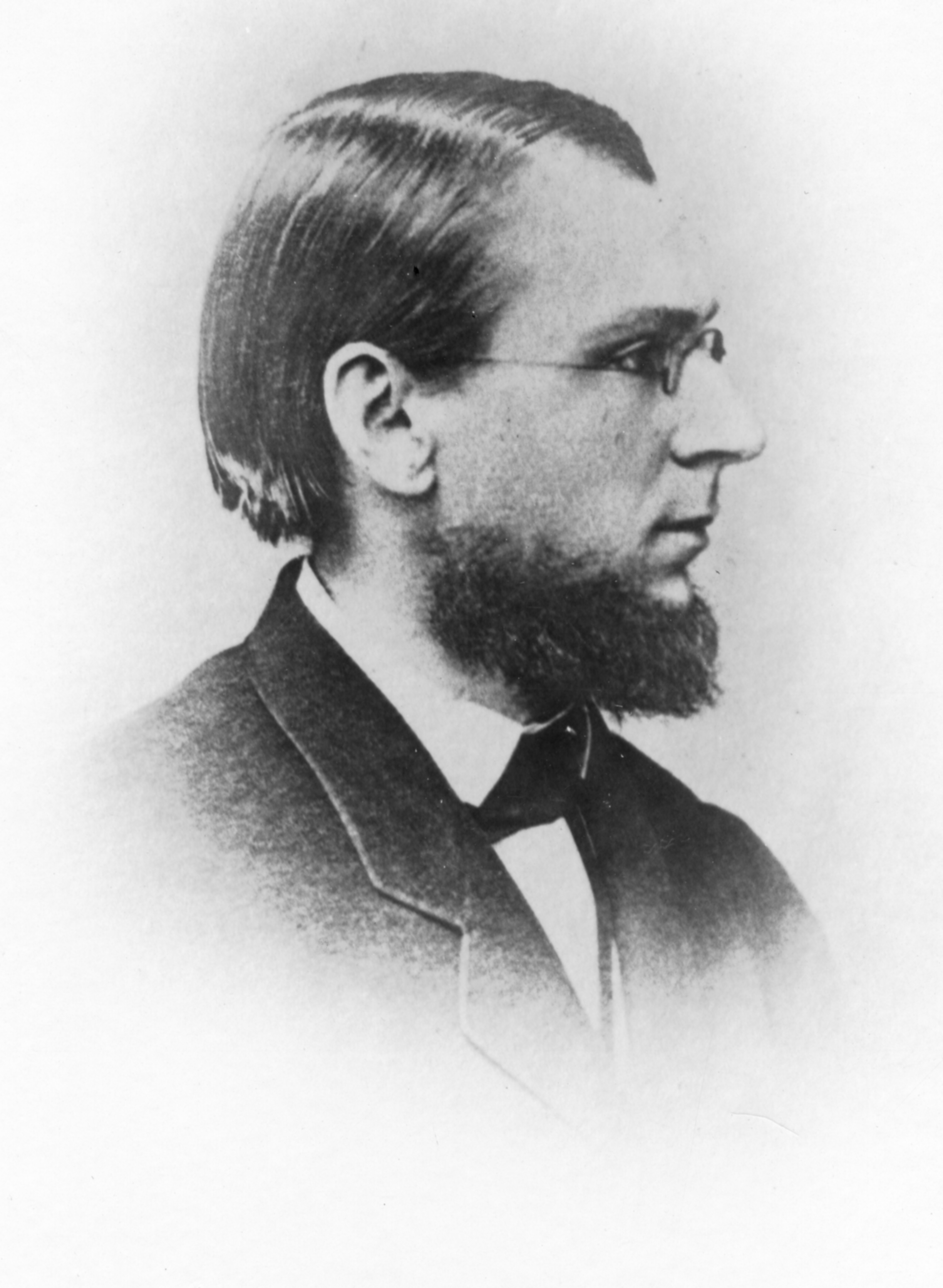
- Lammot du Pont as a Union officer
- Born: April 13, 1831; New Castle County, Delaware, US
- Died: March 29, 1884 (aged 52); Gibbstown, New Jersey, US
- Resting place: Du Pont de Nemours Cemetery
- Education: University of Pennsylvania (B.A.)
- Employer: E. I. du Pont de Nemours and Company
- Spouse: Mary Belin
- Children: Pierre S. du Pont; Irénée du Pont; Lammot du Pont II
- Parent(s): Alfred V. du Pont; Margaretta Elizabeth Lammot
- Relatives: Éleuthère Irénée du Pont (grandfather)

Lammot du Pont I (April 13, 1831 – March 29, 1884) was an American chemist and a key member of the du Pont family and its company in the mid-19th century.

== Early life ==
Du Pont was born in 1831 in New Castle County, Delaware, the son of Margaretta Elizabeth (Lammot) and Alfred V. du Pont, and grandson of French-born Éleuthère Irénée du Pont de Nemours, the founder of E. I. du Pont de Nemours and Company. Lammot was born at Nemours, the family home built in 1824 and named in honor of the full family name.

Lammot studied chemistry at the University of Pennsylvania, and obtained a bachelor of arts degree in 1849.

== Career ==
During the Crimean War, du Pont allegedly was a blockade runner who ran the British blockade to supply Russia with nitre. He entered into the family business, and used his chemistry knowledge to patent B blasting powder in 1857. His invention used an inexpensive Peruvian and Chilean sodium nitrate, which he had discovered in 1858 could be used to manufacture black powder more cheaply than potassium nitrate. In 1861, during the Trent Affair and a temporary saltpetre embargo imposed by the British government against the United States, du Pont negotiated on behalf of the Union for the embargo to be lifted, threatening to put on a fire sale the large quantity of saltpetre he had already purchased in the United Kingdom but was prevented from shipping to an American port, a market glut which would have caused substantial price disruptions. This was despite the fact that the United States ambassador to the United Kingdom, Charles Francis Adams, had advised him to sell the saltpetre off slowly so as not to depress prices significantly. Adams also expressed doubt at du Pont's belief that the saltpetre could not legally be seized by the British government on the grounds that it was not the property of the American government but had been privately purchased by him. Du Pont also secretly devised a covert scheme to have a shipless American captain illegally load the saltpetre and pretend to be a Confederate blockade runner as he sailed west towards a Confederate port before an interception and capture by a Union warship would be orchestrated in order to make it seem as if the Union was not responsible for the violation of the embargo. However, Du Pont ended up being able to ship the saltpetre to the United States legally, as British Prime Minister Lord Palmerston ended up lifting the embargo on 18 January 1862.

In the Civil War, du Pont enlisted in 1862 and was commissioned captain of Company B, 5th Delaware Volunteer Infantry that served at Fort Delaware on Pea Patch Island.

He was elected as a member of the American Philosophical Society in 1872.

In 1880, du Pont convinced his family that a new explosive, dynamite, would eventually make gunpowder obsolete. His vision eventually made the company a major force in the blasting powder industry. Later, he founded the Repauno Chemical Company and helped his family's company enter the high-explosives business.

== Personal life ==
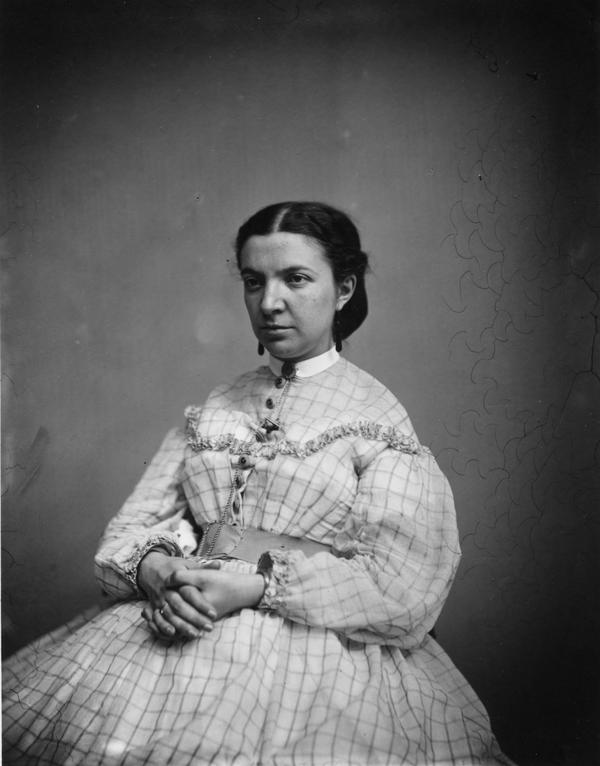
Mary Belin du Pont

Lammot du Pont married Mary Belin (1839–1913) and had 11 children:

- Isabella d'Andelot du Pont (1866–1871)
- Louisa d'Andelot du Pont (1868–1926), married Charles Copeland (1867–1944), one son:
  - Lammot du Pont Copeland (1905–1983)
- Pierre S. du Pont (1870–1954), married Alice Belin, no children
- Sophie Madeleine du Pont (1871–1894)
- Henry Belin du Pont (1873–1902), married Eleuthera du Pont Bradford, one son:
  - Henry Belin du Pont, Jr. (1898–1970)
- William Kemble du Pont (1874–1907), married twice; four children
- Irénée du Pont (1876–1963) married Irene Sophie du Pont, had 10 children:
- Mary Alletta Belin du Pont (1878–1938), married William Winder Laird, one son
- Lammot du Pont II (1880–1952)
- Isabella Mathieu du Pont (1882–1946), married Hugh Rodney Sharp (1880–1968), two children
- Margaretta Lammot du Pont (1884–1973), married Robert Ruliph Morgan Carpenter
  - Louisa d'Andelot Carpenter (1907–1976)
  - Robert Ruliph Morgan Carpenter, Jr. (1915–1990)

He died in a nitroglycerin explosion on March 29, 1884, in Gibbstown, New Jersey.

== Legacy ==
The Lammot du Pont Laboratory at the University of Delaware is named in his honor. The 34,000 square feet (3,200 m^{2})-building houses laboratories of the Department of Chemistry and Biochemistry and the College of Marine Studies.
