= Hagley Museum and Library =

Nonprofit museum and library in Wilmington, Delaware

- U.S. National Register of Historic Places
- U.S. National Historic Landmark District
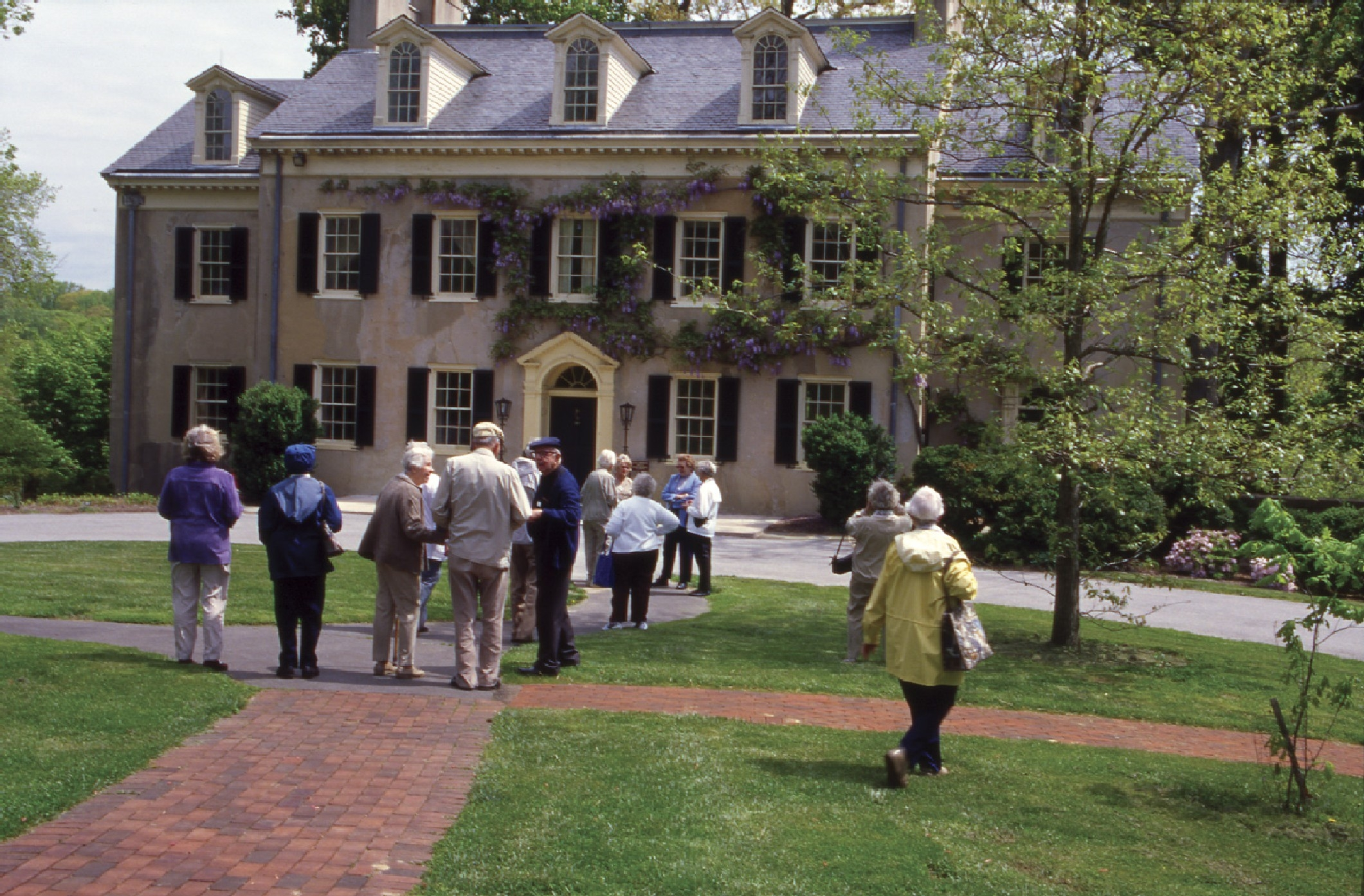

- Location within Delaware Location within the United States
- Nearest city: Wilmington, Delaware, U.S.
- Coordinates: 39°46′50″N 75°34′30″W
- Area: 235 acres (95 ha)
- Built: beginning 1802
- Website: www.hagley.org
- NRHP reference No.: 84000819

Significant dates
- Opened: 1957
- Added to NRHP: November 13, 1966

The Hagley Museum and Library is a nonprofit educational institution in unincorporated New Castle County, Delaware, United States, near Wilmington. Covering more than 235 acres (95 ha) along the banks of the Brandywine Creek, the museum and grounds include the first du Pont family home and garden in the United States, the powder yards, and a 19th-century machine shop. On the hillside below the mansion lies a Renaissance Revival garden, with terraces and statuary, created in the 1920s by Louise Evelina du Pont Crowninshield (1877–1958).

== History ==
In 1802, French immigrant Éleuthère Irénée du Pont founded black powder mills on the banks of Brandywine Creek after purchasing the property in 1801 for US$6,700 (equivalent to $130,000 in 2025). He chose the location for the river's tumble over the Fall Line which provided power, timber and willow trees (used to produce quality charcoal required for superior black powder), the proximity to the Delaware River (on which other ingredients of the powder – sulfur and saltpeter – could be shipped); and the quarries of gneiss that would provide construction materials for the mills. The E. I. du Pont de Nemours & Company's black powder factory became the largest in the world.

In 1921, the mills along the Brandywine closed and parcels of the property were sold. Plans for a museum were established 31 years later, on the occasion of the DuPont Company's 150th anniversary in 1952.

=== Etymology ===
Hagley historians only know that the name was already in use well before E.I. du Pont expanded downstream from Eleutherian Mills in 1813 by purchasing the land that became the Hagley Yards. An 1813 document refers to the land as Hagley and it had been called Hagley as early as 1797, when its owner, Philadelphia Quaker merchant Rumford Dawes, applied for insurance on buildings that were said to be located in a place called Hagley on the Brandywine. Dawes had acquired the property in 1783. Since the name Hagley did not appear on the documents transferring ownership at that time, it seems likely that Dawes gave this name to the Brandywine location.

It seems likely that Delaware's Hagley was named for an English estate, Hagley Hall that was well known in the second half of the eighteenth century. It is likely that Dawes chose the name based on an English narrative poem entitled The Seasons by James Thomson. Hagley Hall was the seat of Thomson's patron the Baron Lyttelton, and the poem's description of a sylvan dale is strikingly reminiscent of the Brandywine Valley. The Seasons was popular in Philadelphia at the time that Rumford Dawes acquired and named Hagley. The English Hagley estate is located in the West Midlands countryside about ten miles southwest of Birmingham. Perhaps coincidentally, Delaware's Hagley is about 8 miles south of Chadds Ford Township, officially known as Birmingham Township before 1996.

At about the same time, Hagley Plantation on the Waccamaw River in South Carolina got its name when the owners, who were admirers of English culture, chose the name Hagley to remind them of the well-known parkland of that name near London.

=== Timeline ===
- November 1952: The Eleutherian Mills-Hagley Foundation, a non-profit, educational corporation received its charter from the State of Delaware.
- May 1957: Hagley Museum was dedicated with the opening of the Henry Clay Mill building.
- 1961: The Longwood Library, founded in 1954 by Pierre S. du Pont, merged with Hagley Museum and opened at the site of the original DuPont Company's powder works at Hagley.
- 1962: Eleutherian Mills, the du Pont family's ancestral home, was opened to the public.
- 1966: Designation of museum property as a National Historic Landmark.
- 1969: Restoration of the first DuPont company office was completed.
- 1971: Restoration of the E.I. du Pont Garden began.
- 1982: Workers' Hill opened. First fireworks show produced for Hagley members in honor of the museum's 25th anniversary. The annual fireworks continues on two weekends in June.
- 1984: Hagley Museum and Library was designated as the official name of the institution. (Eleutherian Mills-Hagley Foundation continued as the legal corporation name of the organization.)
- 1996: Hagley's first car show, 100 Years of Cars, held to honor 100 years of America's automotive heritage. The annual car show continues on the third Sunday in September.
- 1999: The kitchen in Hagley's Eleutherian Mills opens to visitors.
- 2002: Two new exhibits, "DuPont Science and Discovery" and "DuPont: The Explosives Era", open at Hagley in honor of the DuPont corporation's 200th anniversary.
- 2007: Accessible entrance to Visitors Center welcomes visitors to the museum's 50th anniversary exhibit, "Hagley at Fifty: Exploding with History."

== Operations ==
Opened in 1957, the Hagley Museum features exhibits and demonstrations that show the connections between early industrial technology and early American history, focusing on the histories of the du Pont family, DuPont company, explosives and gunpowder, and innovation (through a large collection of American Patent models). There are indoor and outdoor exhibitions, along with restored mills, a workers community, and the original home of the du Pont family with an attached garden.

The Museum also explores personal stories of the 19th-century DuPont Company employees, how they lived, and how their lifestyles changed along with new machinery and new production methods. Visitors can ride a narrated bus tour, through the Powder Yard Trail and is the only way to the home.

== Library ==
The Eleutherian Mills Historical Library was dedicated on October 7, 1961. It was renamed as the Hagley Library in 1984.

Hagley's library houses a major research collection of manuscripts, archives, photographs, pamphlets, and books documenting the history of American business and technology. A member of the Independent Research Libraries Association, the library serves scholars from this country and abroad. Holdings include 37,000 linear feet in the Manuscripts and Archives Department, 290,000 printed volumes in the Imprints Department, 2 million visual items in the Pictorial Department, and more than 300,000 digital images and pages in the Digital Archives Department. The library and archival collections owned by Hagley are open to the public for research; a catalog and partial digital archive are available online.

The library includes the Center for the History of Business, Technology, and Society, which coordinates Hagley's interactions with the world of scholarship in the fields of American economic, business, and technological history. The center offers a scholar-in-residence program and competitive fellowships. It also hosts the Business History Conference, the largest US-based professional organization of business historians, and the editorial office of the peer-reviewed journal, Enterprise & Society.

== Property description ==
=== E. I. du Pont residence complex ===
On the property is the home of Éleuthère Irénée du Pont, who built the Georgian-style home and surrounding buildings and gardens to serve as a center for familial and business life. The home was inhabited by five generations of the du Pont family, with many pieces of furniture, American folk art, and family pieces brought from France still on view. Other buildings that are a part of the complex are a barn, the "First Office" of the company, Lammot du Pont Workshop, and the garden.

The estate home was the first residence of the du Pont family in the United States.

=== Grounds and plants ===
Located on the property are multiple national and state ranked trees. One, an Osage orange tree, was named a Co-National Champion Tree in 2011 and featured in the Delaware Forestry Service's "Big Trees of Delaware" but was partially felled by a storm in August 2020. The tree was speculated to have been over 300 years old or planted via seeds brought back from the Lewis and Clark expedition. Two other trees felled during the storm were state champions, including a 90-foot tall sugar maple and a 62-foot tall shingle oak.

== Depiction in media ==
The Museum was featured on Mysteries at the Museum television show.

== Gallery ==
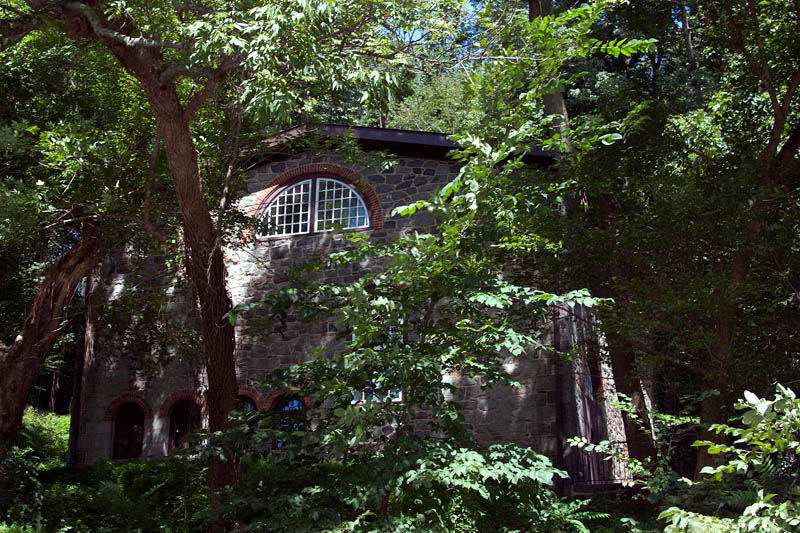
Restored Gunpowder Mill

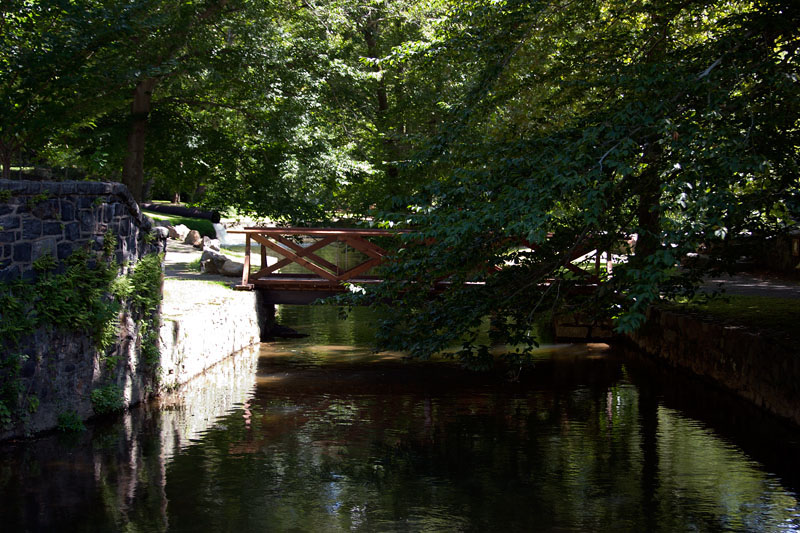
Mill Race

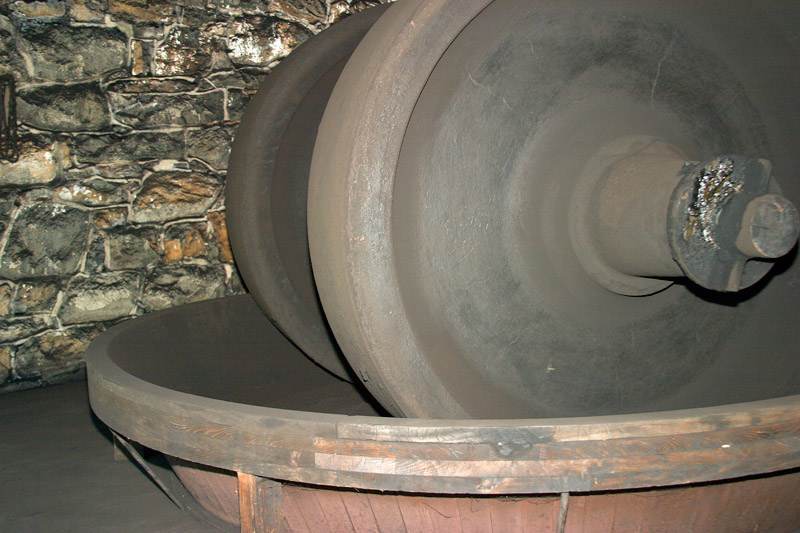
Restored Mill Equipment

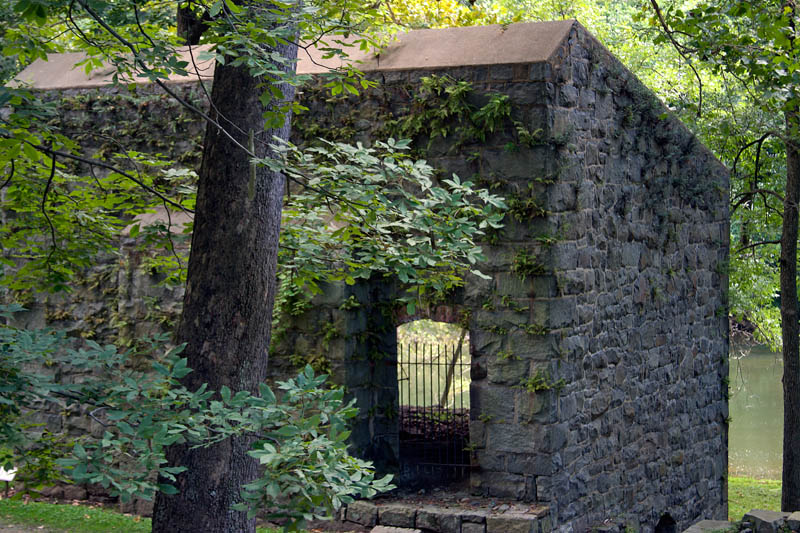
Unrestored Gunpowder Mill

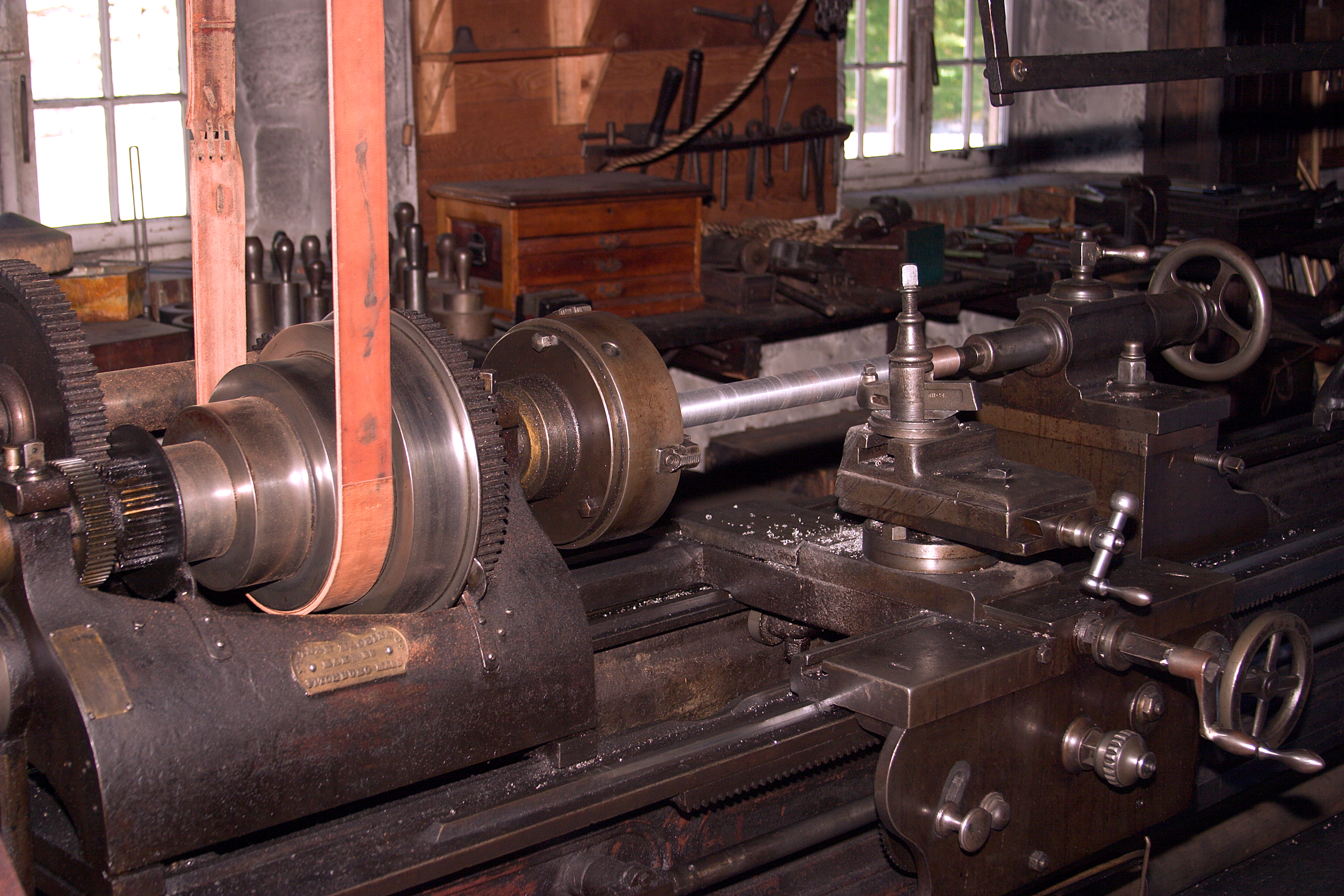
Machinery in Hagley's workshop

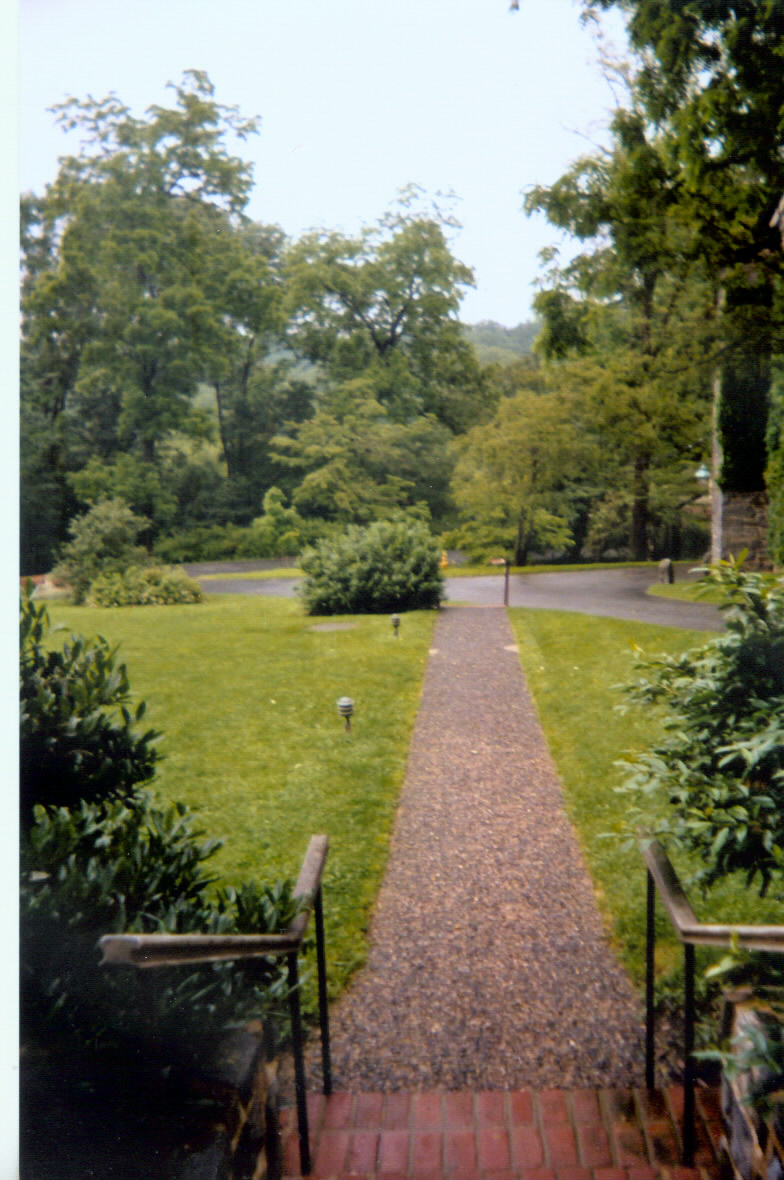
Hagley Museum steps

== See also ==
- List of botanical gardens in the United States
- List of museums in Delaware
- Winterthur Museum, Garden and Library
- Nemours Mansion and Gardens
- Longwood Gardens
- Delaware Historical Society
- David A. Hounshell, historian and academic who started his career at the Hagley Museum
- Breck's Mill Area
- Industrial heritage
