= Eleutherian Mills =

Former gunpowder mill in Wilmington, Delaware

- U.S. National Register of Historic Places
- U.S. National Historic Landmark
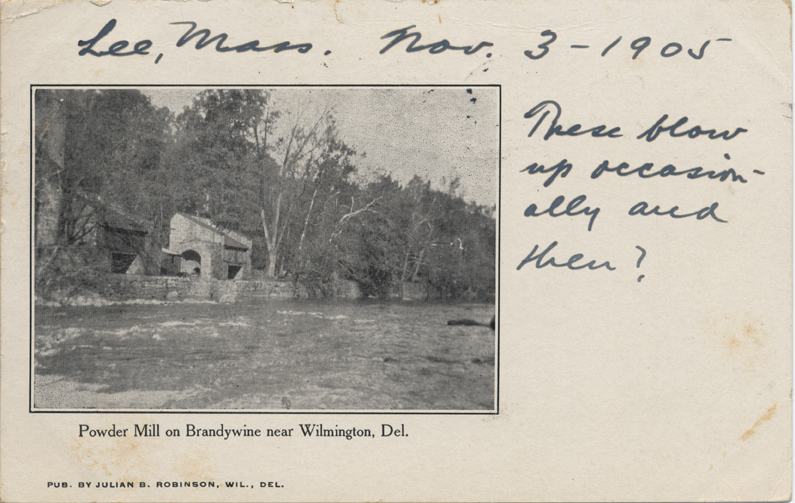
- Working powder mills on Brandywine Creek, about 1905. Note the handwritten "These blow up occasionally, and then?"

- Location within Delaware Location within the United States
- Location: North of Wilmington, Delaware on Delaware Route 141 at Brandywine Creek Bridge
- Coordinates: 39°46′50″N 75°34′30″W
- Area: 191.2 acres (77.4 ha)
- Built: 1803
- NRHP reference No.: 66000259

Significant dates
- Added to NRHP: November 13, 1966
- Designated NHL: November 13, 1966

Eleutherian Mills is a gunpowder mill site that was used for the manufacture of explosives from 1802 to 1921. It was founded by Eleuthère Irénée du Pont, which grew into the DuPont company. The name also refers to the house on the hill above the mills, which was the first du Pont family home in America. In 1957 the site became an outdoor museum when the Hagley Museum and Library was founded. The site was declared a National Historic Landmark in 1966.

== History ==
Jacob Broom built a cotton mill on the Brandywine Creek just north of Wilmington, Delaware, in 1795, which burned down in 1797. In 1802, he sold the site, complete with a working dam and mill race, to Eleuthère Irénée du Pont, who paid $6,740 for the 95 acres (380,000 m^{2}), two years after he and his family left France to escape the French Revolution. He set up the Eleutherian gunpowder mill, based on gunpowder machinery bought from France and site plans for a gunpowder mill supplied by the French government. He also built housing for 30 workers. Starting initially by reworking damaged gunpowder and refining saltpetre for the U.S. government, he quickly moved into gunpowder manufacture. Saltpetre was refined in an area between the house and the mills that now is occupied by a formal garden. Charcoal was produced from the willow trees that lined the Brandywine.

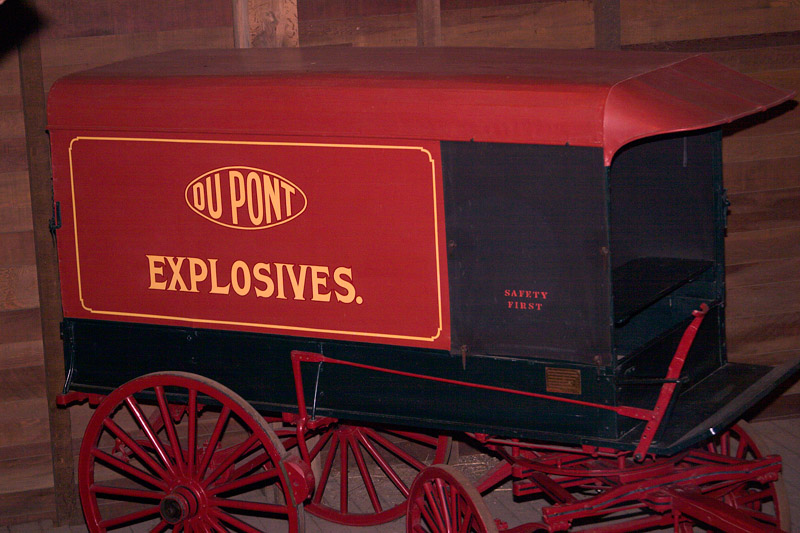
Original DuPont powder wagon

The first domestic supplies of high-quality gunpowder in the U.S. were made here. By the end of 1804, DuPont had sold 39,000 pounds of powder; the following year, sales tripled. The federal government and John Jacob Astor's American Fur Company became regular customers. In 1813, the Hagley property, just downstream from the original mills, was purchased, doubling the size and capacity of the mills. Sales grew during the Mexican–American War and the Crimean War. During the American Civil War, the firm sold 4 million barrels of powder to the federal government. The mill became the largest manufacturer of explosive black powder in the U.S.

=== Role of the du Ponts ===
E. I. du Pont's wife and three children joined him in July 1802, and by 1803, the residence was complete. Their home served as a center of business and social life at Eleutherian Mills for years to come. As he travelled frequently for business affairs, his eldest son Albert Victor became responsible for managing the running of the mills in his absence. Members of the du Pont family ran the powder mills until its closing in 1921. Pierre S. du Pont (1870–1954), who was president of DuPont from 1915 to 1919, and chairman of the board when the mill closed, founded what is today Longwood Gardens.

=== Life at Eleutherian Mills ===
Eleutherian Mills served as a home to the du Pont family for generations, as well as to those who were employed by them. The early du Pont family consisted of E.I. du Pont, his wife Sophie, and their eight children, with extended family in New Jersey. The du Pont household also included those not related to the family, including slaves and indentured servants. Those in the household performed mainly domestic duties, and those employed after the end of slavery and indentured servitude were often family members of those working in the powder mills. The education of children at this time was commonly the responsibility of an educated father. However, E.I. du Pont's travels made this impossible. Thus the education of the du Pont children was conducted through older siblings, specifically Victorine. Instead of sending their children to a public school or to a housewife, they sent Victorine to finishing school when she was 13. At 15, Victorine was considered qualified to teach her younger siblings.

Powder mill workers and their families also lived in towns near the powder yard or even along the Brandywine on DuPont property at Eleutherian Mills. Some of these workers' communities included private family homes, small villages of dwellings, and larger facilities that rented living spaces to employees. The Upper Banks referred to the original powder yards, the main du Pont residence, and workers' communities upstream along the Brandywine. Many of the workers' homes were damaged by an explosion in 1890 and subsequently leveled by the 1915 explosion. Charles Banks, which comprised ten to fifteen residences, was located downstream from the Upper Banks and located in front of smaller communities of four to six row home units, specifically Duck Street and Chicken Alley. Other workers' communities included Walker's Bank and Henry Clay Village. The communities and villages developed within and near Eleutherian Mills also provided taverns, general stores, schools, post offices, and more.

=== Mill explosions ===
Between 1802 and 1921 there were 288 explosions leading to the deaths of 228 people. The three most deadly and remembered explosions occurred in 1818, 1890 and 1915. The 1890 explosion occurred in the Upper Yard, and the 1915 explosion occurred in the Packing House. The 1818 explosion killed 34 people, the 1890 explosion killed 12 people, and the 1915 explosion killed 31 people. Another explosion in 1857 fatally injured five employees, including company partner Alexis Irénée du Pont.

=== Transformation to a museum and historic site ===
After the introduction of smokeless powder, the mills were to be closed in the 1910s but were kept open at the request of the federal government until after the end of World War I. It closed permanently as a business in 1921. In 1952, family members donated 185 acres (0.75 km^{2}) of land and the DuPont company established a $6,000,000 endowment for the Eleutherian Mill-Hagley Foundation for a museum of industrial history. The Hagley Museum and Library formed in 1957. The site was declared a National Historic Landmark in 1966.

== The site ==
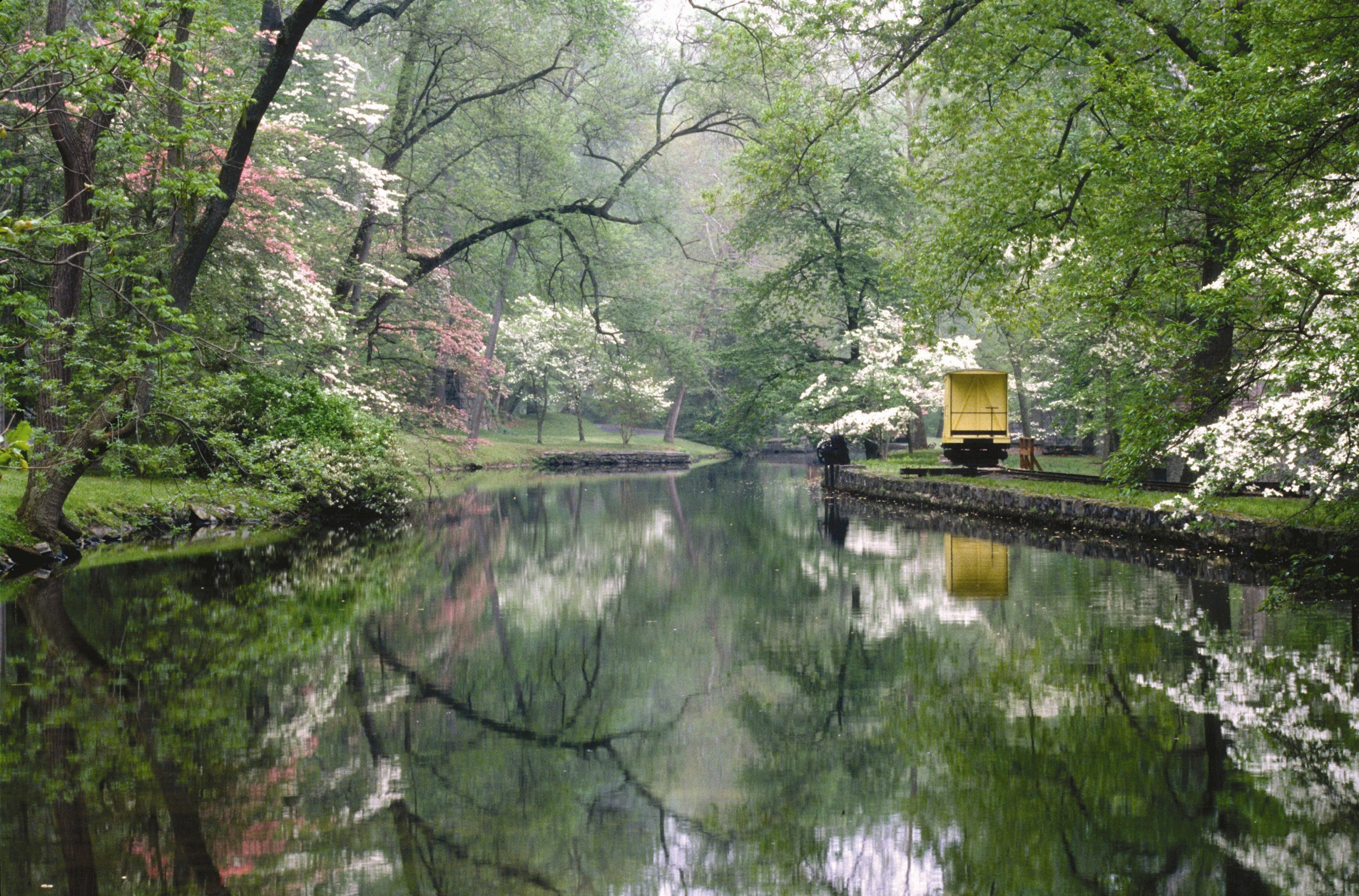
Mill race which supplied water power to the mills. A railway car is on the right.

The mill buildings used in the manufacture of gunpowder were built with strong stone-walled structures on three sides but were only covered by light wood structures on the fourth side, which faced out onto the Brandywine Creek. When an accident occurred, the explosion was directed away from the other mills and storage areas and over the creek.

Water power was provided from a mill race behind the mills, thus further isolating the mills in case of accident. One water wheel was often used to provide power to two mills. Water turbines were introduced in the 1840s. Alfred Victor du Pont acquired additional property downstream from the Eleutherian Mills to add to the manufacturing site. One of these properties was called Hagley, and it became known as the Hagley Yard. Most of the industrial remains are located in the Hagley Yard. The mills were used in the purification, crushing, and mixing of charcoal, sulfur, and saltpeter. Other mills in the complex were used for glazing and corning, making metal powder kegs, and in cotton and woolen manufacturing. Stables, offices, a machine shop, and a steam powerhouse from the late 19th century also were located in the complex, as was a narrow gauge railway.

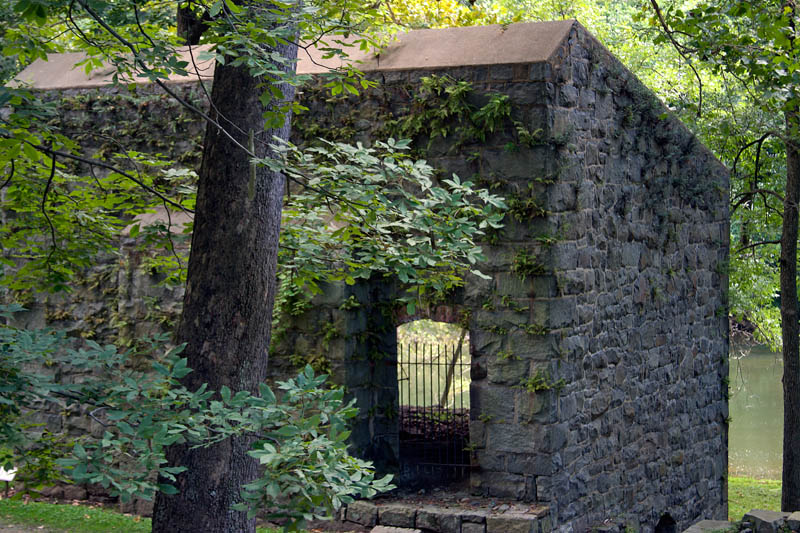
Unrestored mill on the Brandywine

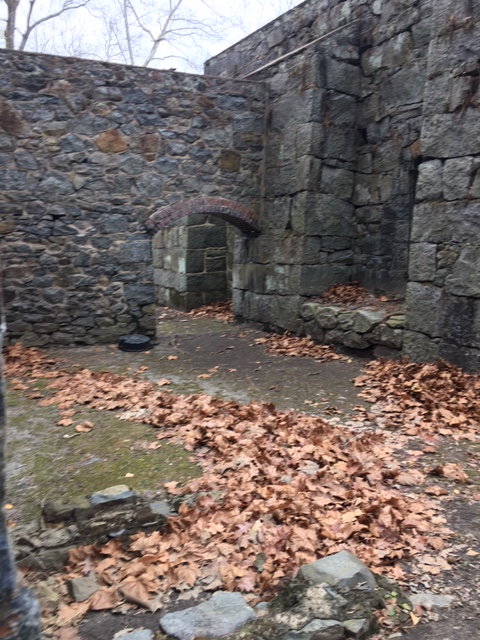
Interior view of powder mill on Hagley Yard section of property as of November 2018.

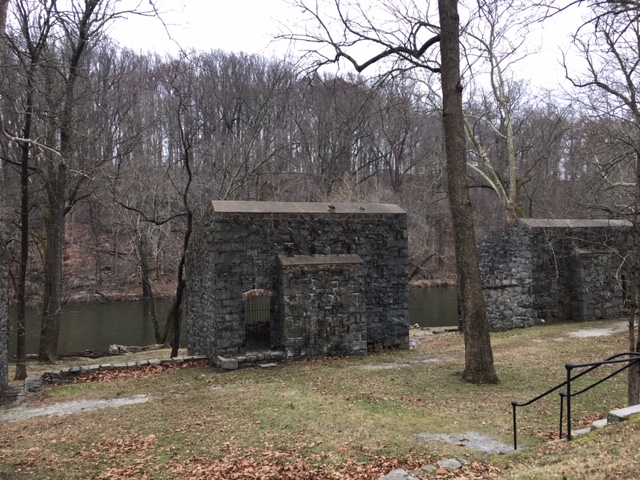
Exterior view of powder mills on Hagley Yard section of property as of November 2018.

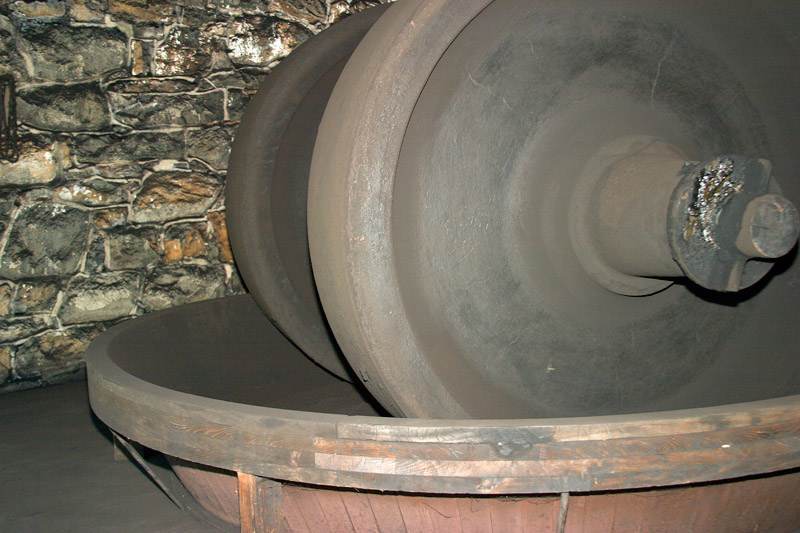
Edge-runner mill in a restored mill

== See also ==
=== National Register ===
- National Register of Historic Places listings in northern New Castle County, Delaware
- List of National Historic Landmarks in Delaware

=== Gunpowder ===
- History of gunpowder
- Gunpowder

=== United States ===
- Brandywine Battlefield
- Hagley Museum and Library

=== Elsewhere ===
- Ballincollig Royal Gunpowder Mills
- Faversham explosives industry
- Waltham Abbey Royal Gunpowder Mills
