= Éleuthère Irénée du Pont =

French-American chemist and industrialist (1771–1834)

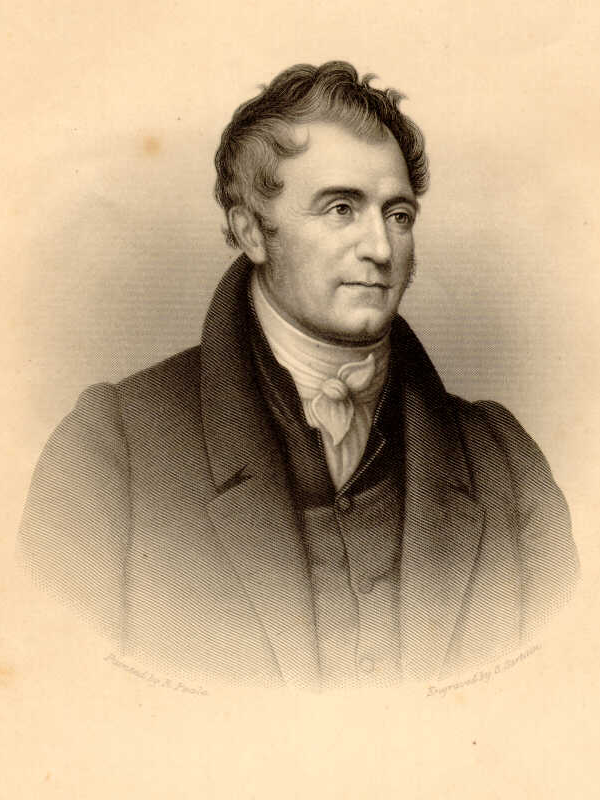
- Born: Éleuthère Irénée du Pont de Nemours; 24 June 1771; Paris, Kingdom of France
- Died: 31 October 1834 (aged 63); Philadelphia, Pennsylvania, U.S.
- Resting place: Du Pont de Nemours Cemetery (Wilmington, Delaware, U.S.)
- Known for: Founder of the original DuPont company
- Title: President, E. I. du Pont de Nemours and Company
- Term: 1804–1834
- Successor: Alfred Victor Philadelphe du Pont
- Spouse: Sophie Madeleine Dalmas
- Children: Victorine Elizabeth; Lucille; Evelina Gabrielle; Alfred Victor; Eleuthera; Sophie; Henry; Alexis Irénée
- Parent(s): Pierre Samuel du Pont de Nemours; Nicole-Charlotte Marie-Louise le Dée de Rencourt
- Relatives: Du Pont family

Signature
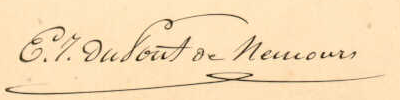

Éleuthère Irénée du Pont de Nemours (/djuːˈpɒnt, ˈdjuːpɒnt/ dew-PONT, DEW-pont, French: [eløtɛʁ iʁene dy pɔ̃ d(ə) nəmuʁ]; 24 June 1771 – 31 October 1834) was a French-American chemist and industrialist who founded the gunpowder manufacturer E. I. du Pont de Nemours and Company. His descendants, the du Pont family, have been one of the richest and most prominent American families since the 19th century, with generations of influential businessmen, politicians and philanthropists. In 1807, du Pont was elected a member of the American Philosophical Society in his adopted hometown of Philadelphia.

== Early life and education ==
Du Pont was born 24 June 1771, in Paris, the son of Pierre Samuel du Pont de Nemours and Nicole-Charlotte Marie-Louise le Dée de Rencourt. His father was a political economist who had been elevated to the nobility in 1784 by letters patent granted by King Louis XVI, allowing him to carry the honorable de Nemours suffix. Growing up on his father's estate, "Bois des Fossés", near Égreville, young du Pont was enthusiastic about his studies in most subjects, and showed particular interest in explosives.

Du Pont was an Huguenot.

In the fall of 1785, du Pont entered Collège de France in Paris. Two years later, he was accepted by the friend of his father and noted chemist Antoine Lavoisier as a student in the Régie des poudres, the government agency responsible for the manufacture of gunpowder. It was from Lavoisier that he gained his expertise in nitrate extraction and manufacture. He studied "advanced explosives production techniques".

After a brief apprenticeship, he took a position at the government-owned powder works in Essonne but quit after Lavoisier left.

Du Pont eventually sailed before his family and landed at Newport, Rhode Island on 1 January 1800, along with his father and his brother's family. By 1802, he had established both his business and his family home, Eleutherian Mills, on the Brandywine Creek in Delaware. Du Pont's 1 January 1800 arrival in the United States is still celebrated annually by his descendants.

== Career ==
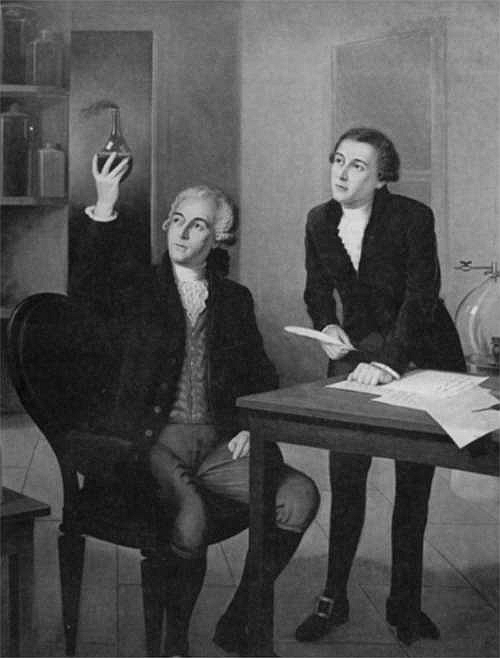
Eleuthère (right) and his mentor, Antoine Lavoisier

In 1791, du Pont began to help his father manage their small publishing house in Paris, where they published a republican newspaper in support of governmental reforms in France. Du Pont was a member of the pro-Revolution national guard and supported the Jacobins. However, on 20 August 1792, both du Pont and his father participated in protecting the escape of Louis XVI and Marie Antoinette when the Tuileries Palace was stormed. His father angered fellow revolutionaries by refusing to go along with the guillotine execution of Louis XVI, and the two men's moderate political views proved to be a liability in revolutionary France.

His father was arrested in 1794, only avoiding execution because of the end of the Reign of Terror. In September 1797, du Pont and his father spent a night in La Force prison while their home and presses were ransacked. These events led his father to lose hope in the political situation in France, and so he began making plans to move their family to America and aspired to create a model community of French émigrés. On 2 October 1799, the du Pont family sold their publishing house and set sail for the United States. They reached Rhode Island on 1 January 1800 and began to settle in the home the eldest du Pont had secured in Bergen Point, New Jersey.

They soon set up an office in New York City to decide what their new line of business would be, but Éleuthère Irénée was not included in much of these plans. However, he saw the possibilities that his earlier apprenticeship with Lavoisier would allow him and his family in America.

=== E.I. du Pont de Nemours and Company ===
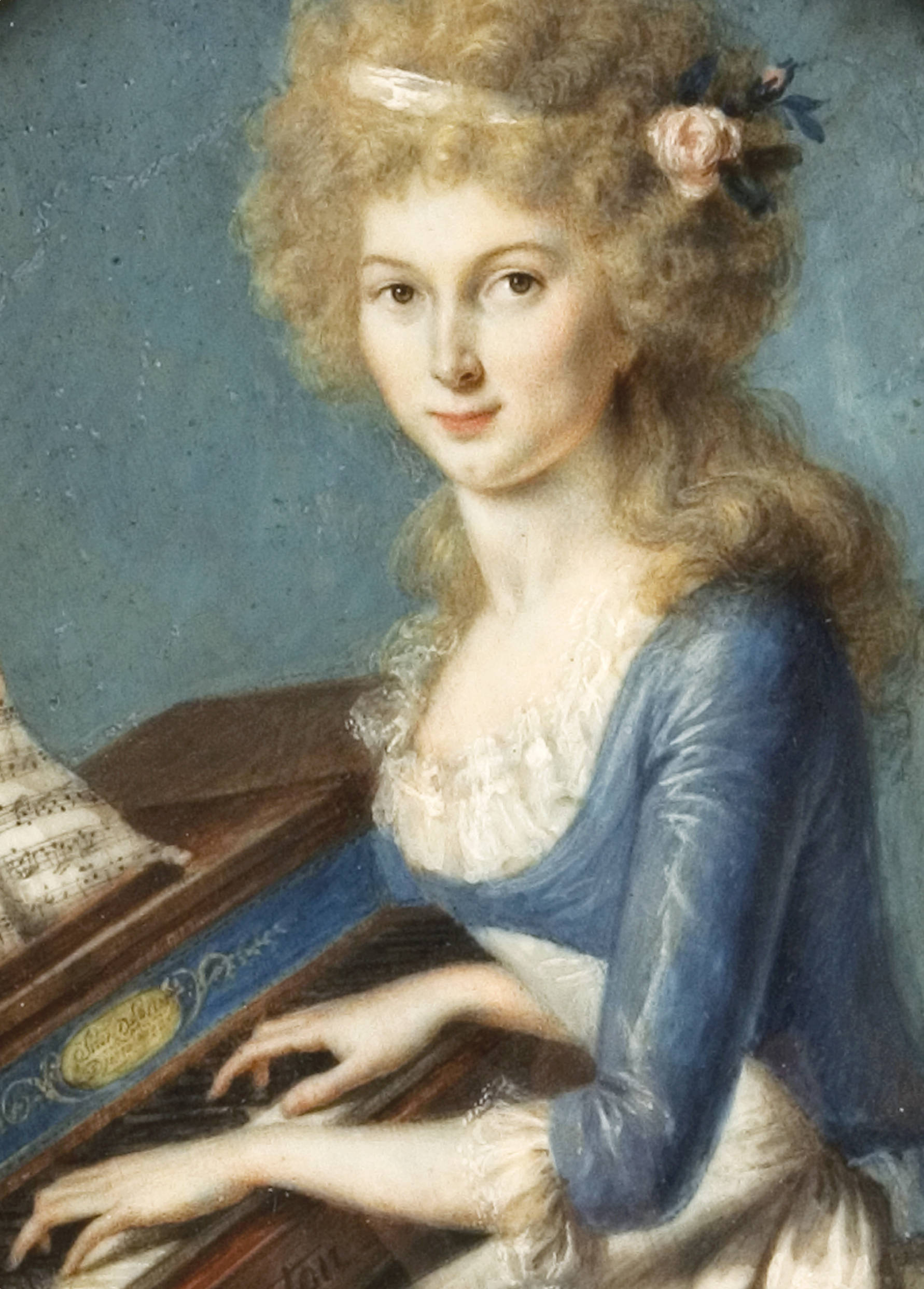
Du Pont's wife, Sophie Madeleine Dalmas du Pont

Du Pont had no thought of becoming involved with gunpowder manufacture again upon his arrival in the United States, but he brought with him an expertise in chemistry and gunpowder making, during a time when the quality of American-made gunpowder was very poor. Delaware legend holds that he decided to go into the gunpowder business during a fateful hunting trip with Major Louis de Tousard, a former French artillery officer then employed by the United States Army to procure gunpowder supplies. Du Pont's gun misfired as he attempted to shoot a bird, which caused him to reflect on his powder-making apprenticeship with Lavoisier as a youth in France. Du Pont commented on the inferior quality of the American-made powder they were using for hunting despite its high price.

At du Pont's request, Tousard arranged a tour of an American powder plant. He quickly deduced that the saltpeter being used was of good enough quality; however, the American refining process was poor and inefficient compared with the techniques he had learned in France. He began to think that he could use his experience from France to manufacture gunpowder of a higher quality in the United States and reform the current industry standard for refinery. With his father's blessing, he began to assemble capital for the construction of the first powder mills, and returned to France in the beginning of 1801 to procure the necessary financing and equipment.

The act of association was signed on 21 April 1801, and the company was christened E.I. du Pont de Nemours & Company since it was its namesake's ingenuity that had created this venture. His gunpowder company was capitalized at $36,000 ($697,000 in 2025) with 18 shares at $2,000 each. He purchased a site on Brandywine Creek for $6,740. There were several small buildings and a dam with foundations for a cotton-spinning mill which had been destroyed by fire. The first gunpowder was produced in April 1804.

== Personal life ==
Du Pont married Sophie Dalmas (1775–1828) in 1791, and they had eight children.

== Death ==
Du Pont died on 31 October 1834 in Philadelphia, aged 63. The cause of death was not definitively specified due to "conflicting reports of either cholera or a heart attack" as its cause. He was buried in the Du Pont de Nemours Cemetery on the family property in Wilmington, Delaware.

== Legacy ==
The company du Pont founded would become one of the largest and most successful American corporations. By the mid-19th century it was the largest supplier of gunpowder to the U.S. military, and supplied as much as 40 percent of the powder used by the Union Army during the American Civil War.

Du Pont's sons, Alfred V. du Pont (1798–1856) and Henry du Pont (1812–1889), managed the plant after his death, following three years of tutelage by his son-in-law, Jacques Antoine Bidermann. His grandson, Lammot du Pont I (1831–1884), was the first president of the United States Gunpowder Trade Association, popularly known as the Powder Trust.

== See also ==
- Du Pont family
- Eleutherian Mills
- Hagley Museum and Library

| President of Du Pont; 1802 – 31 October 1834 | Succeeded by Alfred V. du Pont |
