= Du Pont family =

Wealthy American family

du Pont family
- Coat of arms of Samuel Francis Du Pont
- Current region: Wilmington, Delaware; U.S.
- Earlier spellings: du Pont de Nemours du Pont
- Etymology: du Pont, "Of the bridge"
- Origin: French American Community — France, United States
- Connected families: Astor family; Molson family; Roosevelt family
- Motto: Rectitudine sto (Latin for 'Stand upright')
- Estates: Eleutherian Mills (Wilmington); Nemours (Wilmington); Winterthur Mansion and Gardens (Winterthur)

The du Pont family (English: /duːˈpɒnt/) or Du Pont family is a prominent family descended from Pierre Samuel du Pont de Nemours (1739–1817), a French minor aristocrat. Currently residing in the U.S. states of Delaware and Pennsylvania, the Du Ponts have been one of the country's richest families since the mid-19th century, when they founded their fortune in the gunpowder business. In the late 19th and early 20th centuries, they expanded their wealth through the chemical industry and the automotive industry, with substantial interests in the DuPont company, General Motors, and various other corporations.

Several former du Pont family estates are open to the public as museums, gardens or parks, such as Winterthur, Nemours, Eleutherian Mills, Longwood Gardens, Gibraltar, Mt. Cuba, and Goodstay. The family's interest in horticulture was brought to the United States by their immigrant progenitors from France and reinforced in later generations by avid gardeners who married into the family. As early as 1924, the du Ponts were recognized by Charles Sprague Sargent, the famed plantsman and director of Harvard's Arnold Arboretum, as "a family which has made the neighborhood of Wilmington, Delaware one of the chief centers of horticulture in the United States."

The family's first American estate, Eleutherian Mills, located at Hagley Museum and Library, was preserved and restored by Louise E. du Pont Crowninshield. She also helped to establish the National Trust for Historic Preservation in 1949. In recent years, the family has continued to be known for its association with political and business ventures.

As of 2016, the family fortune was estimated at $14.3 billion, spread across more than 3,500 living relatives.

== History ==
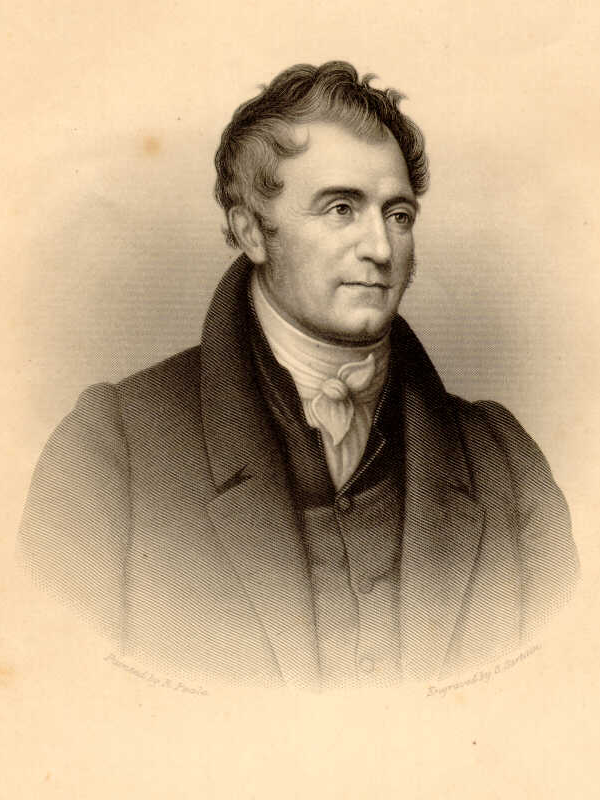
Éleuthère Irénée du Pont, founder of the du Pont business dynasty.

Pierre Samuel du Pont de Nemours was the son of a Parisian watchmaker and a member of a Burgundian Huguenot family ennobled in the 18th century. On his mother's side, he was a descendant of a minor noble family. In 1800, he and his sons, Victor Marie du Pont and Éleuthère Irénée du Pont, migrated from France to the United States. He used the resources of their Huguenot heritage to found one of the most prominent of American families, and one of its most successful corporations, E. I. du Pont de Nemours and Company, initially established by Éleuthère Irénée as a gunpowder manufacturer.

In 1802, Éleuthère Irénée du Pont established a gunpowder mill on the banks of the Brandywine River near Wilmington, Delaware. The location, named Eleutherian Mills, provided all the necessities to operate the mill: a water flow sufficient to power it, available timber (mainly willow trees) that could be turned into charcoal fine enough to use for gunpowder, and close proximity to the Delaware River to allow for shipments of sulfur and saltpeter, the other ingredients used in the manufacture of gunpowder. There were also nearby stone quarries to provide needed building materials.

Over time, the Du Pont company grew into the largest black powder manufacturing firm in the world. The family remained in control of the company up to the 1960s, and family trusts still own a substantial amount of the company's stock. This and other companies run by the du Pont family employed up to 10 percent of Delaware's population at its peak. In the 19th century, the Du Pont family maintained their family wealth by carefully arranged marriages between cousins which, at the time, was the norm for many families.

The family played a large part in politics during the 18th and 19th centuries and assisted in negotiations for the Treaty of Paris and the Louisiana Purchase. Both T. Coleman and Henry A. du Pont served as U.S. senators. Pierre S. du Pont, IV served as Governor of Delaware.

The family has played an important role in historic preservation and land conservation, including helping to found the National Trust for Historic Preservation, preserving President James Madison's home Montpelier, and establishing numerous museums such as Winterthur and the Delaware Museum of Natural History. The Brandywine Conservancy, founded by family member George Alexis Weymouth, owns around 2,350 acres (951 ha) of land in Pennsylvania and Delaware, and owns permanent conservation easements on an additional 37,000 acres (14,973 ha). In 2013, Lammot du Pont Copeland's Mt. Cuba Center contributed over $20 million to purchase land for donation to the federal government, to form the First State National Historical Park.

Beginning with William du Pont, Jr. and his sister, Marion duPont Scott, many members of the Du Pont family have been involved in the breeding and racing of thoroughbred racehorses, as well as establishing racehorse venues and training tracks, including Delaware Park and Fair Hill, Maryland. While most Du Ponts are members of the Episcopal Church, Éleuthère Irénée du Pont was a Huguenot.

== Spelling of the name ==
The stylings "du Pont" and "Du Pont" are most prevalent for the family name in published, copy-edited writings. In many publications, the styling is "du Pont" when quoting an individual's full name and "Du Pont" when speaking of the family as a whole. Some individual Du Ponts have chosen to style it differently, such as Samuel Francis Du Pont. The name of the chemical company founded by the family is today styled solid as "DuPont" in the short form. The long form is styled as E. I. du Pont de Nemours and Company. The stylings "Du Pont" and "DuPont" for the company's short name coexisted in the 20th century, but the latter is now consistently used in the company's branding.

The solid styling "duPont" is less common. The Nemours Alfred I. duPont Hospital for Children uses it, as does the duPont Registry. William S. Dutton's mid-20th-century history of the family business uses "Du Pont" both for the family mentioned generally and for the company's short name, but "du Pont" in an individual's full name, for example, "Éleuthère Irénée du Pont", "Henry du Pont", "Alfred Victor du Pont", "Lammot du Pont". For example, "when he [Lammot du Pont] went to General Henry du Pont with the proposal that the Du Ponts manufacture dynamite, he was answered by a blunt and unqualified 'No!'")

The first page of Dutton's monograph contains the following footnote about the surname's styling. The mention of "Samuel Dupont" here refers to the 18th-century Parisian watchmaker, not to his 19th-century descendant: "Samuel Dupont used this form of the family name [i.e., Dupont], but beginning in 1763 his son signed himself 'Du Pont.' Later, he added 'de Nemours' to his name to prevent confusion with two other Duponts in the French Chamber of Deputies. Du Pont, in English, is pronounced with the accent on the second syllable. In French, neither syllable is accented."

French orthographic tradition for the styling of de, or its inflected forms, as a surname particle, in either nobiliary or non-nobiliary form, is discussed at Nobiliary particle § France. In non-nobiliary form, the prevalent French styling of the name is "Dupont". Thus the choice by Pierre Samuel du Pont de Nemours to begin styling himself so during the monarchical era hints at social ambition. Today the influence of French orthography and prerevolutionary class structure on how English orthography styles surnames today is outweighed by how families and individuals so named style themselves.

== Alphabetical list of selected descendants of Pierre Samuel du Pont de Nemours ==
Below is an alphabetical listing of selected members of the family.

- Alexis Felix du Pont (1879–1948)
- Alexis Felix du Pont Jr. (1905–1996)
- Alexis Irénée du Pont (1816–1857)
- Alexis Irénée du Pont Jr. (1843–1904)
- Alexis Irénée du Pont Bayard (1918–1985)
- Alfred Irénée du Pont (1864–1935)
- Alfred Victor Philadelphe du Pont (1798–1856)
- Alice Frances du Pont (1912–2002)
- Amy Elizabeth du Pont (1875–1962)
- Benjamin Franklin du Pont (born 1964)
- Charles Irénée du Pont (1797–1869)
- Charles L. Copeland (born 1963)
- Coleman Dupont Donaldson (1922–2009)
- Éleuthère Irénée du Pont (1771–1834)
- Éleuthère Paul du Pont (1887–1950)
- Esther D. du Pont (1908–1984)
- Ethel du Pont (1916–1965)
- Eugene du Pont (1840–1902)
- Francis Gurney du Pont (1850–1904)
- Francis Irénée du Pont (1873–1942)
- Francis Victor du Pont (1894–1962)
- Franklin D. Roosevelt III (born 1938)
- George Alexis Weymouth (1936–2016)
- Harry Alfred Rée (1914–1991)
- Henry du Pont (1812–1889)
- Henry Algernon du Pont (1838–1926)
- Henry Francis du Pont (1880–1969)
- Hugh Rodney Sharp Jr. (1909–1990)
- Jane du Pont Lunger (1914–2001)
- John Éleuthère du Pont (1938–2010)
- Irénée du Pont (1876–1963)
- Lammot du Pont I (1831–1884)
- Lammot du Pont II (1880–1952)
- Lammot du Pont Copeland (1905–1983)
- Louisa d'Andelot Carpenter (1907–1976)
- Louise Evelina du Pont Crowninshield (1877–1958)
- Lydia Chichester du Pont (1907–1958)
- Marion duPont Scott (1894–1983)
- Pierre Samuel du Pont de Nemours (1739–1817)
- Pierre S. du Pont (1870–1954)
- Pierre S. "Pete" du Pont IV (1935–2021)
- Richard Chichester du Pont (1911–1943)
- Robert Brett Lunger (born 1945)
- Robert Ruliph Morgan Carpenter Jr. (1915–1980)
- Ruth Ellen du Pont (1922–2014)
- Samuel Francis Du Pont (1803–1865)
- Thomas Coleman du Pont (1863–1930)
- Victor Marie du Pont (1767–1827)
- Victorine du Pont Bauduy (1792–1861)
- Victorine du Pont Homsey (1900–1998)
- William du Pont (1855–1928)
- William du Pont Jr. (1896–1965)
- Zara DuPont (1869–1946)

== Family tree ==
The following list is not a complete genealogy, but is ordered by descent to show the familial relationships between members of the du Pont family throughout history.

The du Pont family tree

Pierre Samuel du Pont de Nemours
Victor Marie du Pont	Éleuthère Irénée du Pont
Charles I. du Pont	Samuel Francis Du Pont	Alfred V. du Pont	Henry du Pont	Alexis Irénée du Pont
Éleuthère Irénée du Pont II	Lammot du Pont I	Antoine Biderman du Pont	William du Pont	Henry A. du Pont	Eugene du Pont	Francis Gurney du Pont
Alfred I. du Pont	Pierre S. du Pont	Irénée du Pont	Lammot du Pont II	Antoine Biderman du Pont, Jr. (brother of T. Coleman du Pont, who was the father of Francis Victor du Pont)	Marion duPont Scott	William du Pont, Jr.	Louise E. du Pont Crowninshield	Henry Francis du Pont	Eugene du Pont, Jr.	Amy Elizabeth du Pont	Francis Irénée du Pont	A. Felix du Pont	E. Paul du Pont
Esther D. du Pont	Pierre S. du Pont III	Victorine du Pont Homsey	John Eleuthère du Pont	William du Pont III	Ruth Ellen du Pont	Ethel du Pont	A. Felix du Pont Jr.	Lydia Chichester du Pont	Richard Chichester du Pont	Alice du Pont Mills
Pierre S. du Pont IV
Ben duPont	Eleuthère I. du Pont

== Network ==
=== Associates ===
The following is a list of figures closely aligned with or subordinate to the du Pont family.

- Edward Ball
- Thomas F. Bayard Jr.
- Joe Biden
- Jacques Antoine Bidermann
- Lucius M. Boomer
- Donaldson Brown
- C. Douglass Buck
- Wallace Carothers
- R. R. M. Carpenter
- Walter S. Carpenter Jr.
- Theophilus P. Chandler Jr.
- Uma Chowdhry
- Marian Cruger Coffin
- Thomas M. Connelly
- William D. Denney
- Herbert S. Eleuterio
- Linda Fisher
- Crawford Greenewalt
- Charles O. Holliday
- Edward G. Jefferson
- Ellen J. Kullman
- James Lynah
- James P. Mills
- Hugh M. Morris
- William Dale Phillips
- John J. Raskob
- Donald P. Ross
- Franklin D. Roosevelt Jr.
- Willard Saulsbury Jr.
- Irving S. Shapiro
- William H. Shaw
- Alfred Sloan
- Newton Steers

=== Businesses ===
The following is a list of businesses in which the du Pont family held a controlling or otherwise substantial interest.

- Bellevue-Stratford Hotel
- Central Coal and Iron Company
- Conoco
- Delaware Trust Company
- DuPont de Nemours, Inc.
- The Equitable Life Assurance Society
- Fair Hill Training Center
- Florida East Coast Railway
- Florida National Bank
- General Motors
- Hercules Powder Company
- Hickory Tree Farm & Stable
- Hotel McAlpin
- Indian Motocycle Manufacturing Company
- Nemours Trading Corporation
- National Bank of Detroit
- The News Journal
- North American Aviation
- Philadelphia Phillies
- Piasecki Helicopter Corporation
- Remington Arms Company
- St. Joe Company
- US Airways
- United States Rubber Company
- Victorine & Samuel Homsey
- Wilmington Trust
- yet2.com

=== Philanthropy and nonprofit organizations ===
- Alfred I. duPont Testamentary Trust
- American Liberty League
- Camp Rodney (Boy Scouts of America)
- Chichester Dupont Foundation
- Delaware Museum of Natural History
- DuPont-MIT Alliance
- Jessie Ball duPont Fund
- Kennett High School
- Longwood Foundation
- Marion duPont Scott Equine Medical Center
- National Trust for Historic Preservation
- Nemours Children's Hospital, Delaware
- Nemours Foundation
- New Bolton Center
- Phi Kappa Sigma
- Population Action International
- Springfield Foundation, Inc.
- St. Andrew's School
- Thouron Scholars Program
- Unidel Foundation
- Zip Code Wilmington

== Buildings, estates and historic landmarks ==
- Bellevue State Park (Delaware)
- Brandywine Creek State Park
- Delaware Park Racetrack
- DuPont Building
- DuPont-Guest Estate
- DuPont Highway
- DuPont Village Historic District
- Epping Forest
- Fairlee Manor Camp House
- Hagley Museum and Library
- Dupont historic sites along Delaware Rte. 141
- Eleutherian Mills
- Empire State Building
- Longwood Gardens
- Louviers (Wilmington, Delaware)
- Lower Louviers and Chicken Alley
- Montpelier
- Mt. Cuba Center
- Nemours Mansion and Gardens
- Owl's Nest Country Place
- Ruth Wales du Pont Sanctuary
- Stockton-Montmorency
- Strand Millas and Rock Spring
- Owl's Nest Country Place
- Wilmington Trust Company Bank
- Winterthur Museum, Garden and Library
