= Franklin D. Roosevelt (disambiguation) =

Franklin D. Roosevelt (1882–1945) was the president of the United States from 1933 to 1945.

Franklin Roosevelt, Franklin D. Roosevelt or Franklin Delano Roosevelt may also refer to:

== Things named after the president ==
- USS Franklin D. Roosevelt (CV-42), an aircraft carrier
- Franklin D. Roosevelt State Park, Yorktown, New York
- Franklin Delano Roosevelt Park, South Philadelphia, Pennsylvania
- Parque Franklin Delano Roosevelt, Ciudad de la Costa, near Montevideo, Uruguay
- Franklin Delano Roosevelt Bridge, connecting Maine and New Brunswick
- Avenue Franklin Roosevelt, Brussels
- Franklin D. Roosevelt Lake, Washington state
- Franklin D. Roosevelt station, a Paris Metro station
- Franklin D. Roosevelt High School (Dallas), Texas
- Franklin Delano Roosevelt High School (New York City), Brooklyn, New York
- Franklin Delano Roosevelt High School (Hyde Park, New York)

== Relatives of the president ==
- Franklin D. Roosevelt Jr. (1914–1988), American politician, fifth child of Franklin D. Roosevelt
- Franklin D. Roosevelt III (born 1938), American economist, grandson of Franklin D. Roosevelt
