= Felix du Pont =

Felix du Pont may refer to:

- A. Felix du Pont
- A. Felix du Pont, Jr.
