= Richard Chichester du Pont =

American businessman

- du Pont circa 1930-1940
- Born: January 2, 1911; Wilmington, Delaware, U.S.
- Died: September 11, 1943 (aged 32); March Field, Riverside County, California, U.S.
- Cause of death: Military aircraft crash
- Education: University of Virginia
- Occupation: Airline owner
- Known for: Co-founder: All American Aviation; U.S. National Soaring Champion (1934, 1935, 1937)
- Spouse: Helena Allaire Crozer
- Children: Richard Jr. (1937–1986); Lana (b. 1939)
- Parent(s): A. Felix du Pont & Mary Chichester
- Relatives: Siblings: Alexis Felix, Jr. (1905–1996); Lydia Chichester (1907–1958); Alice Frances (1912–2002)
- Honors: Distinguished Service Medal (1943); Soaring Hall of Fame (1954)

Richard Chichester du Pont (January 2, 1911 – September 11, 1943) was an American businessman and an aviation and glider pioneer who was a member of the prominent Du Pont family. He was the founder of the major US legacy carrier US Airways, after serving as a special assistant to General Henry H. Arnold, the chief of the United States Air Forces.

== Biography ==
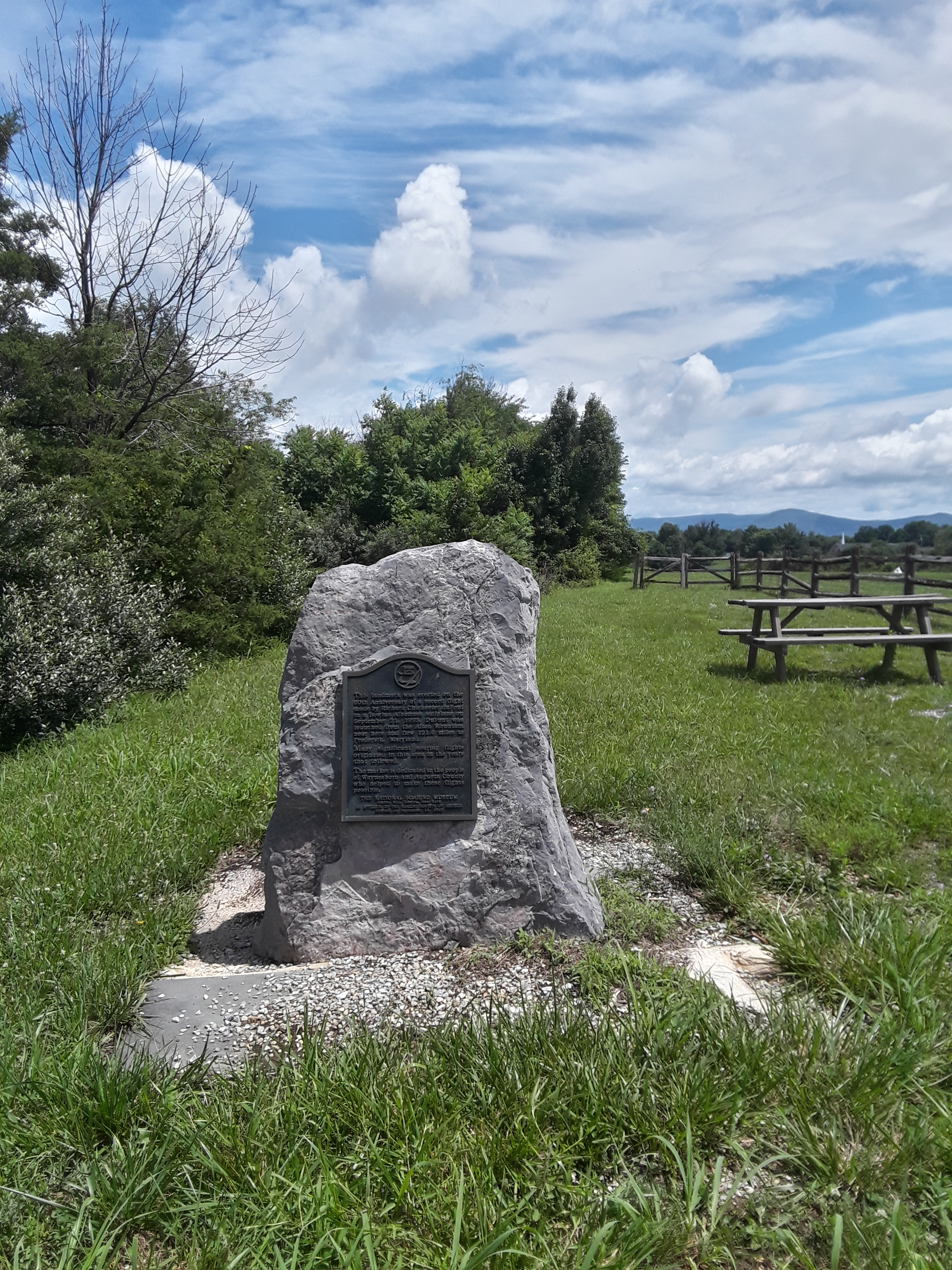
Marker in honor of du Pont's flight from Afton Mountain, erected at Eagle's Nest Airport in Waynesboro, Virginia

He was born on January 2, 1911, in Wilmington, Delaware. He was the son of A. Felix du Pont (1879–1948) and Mary Chichester (1878–1965). As a young boy he developed an enthusiasm for aviation and took flying lessons. His interest in flight expanded to include gliders and he was flying them while still a teenager. At the University of Virginia, he founded a campus soaring club. In 1932, he went to study aviation at the Curtiss-Wright Technical Institute. That year, he and his sister Alice (1912–2002) flew an open-cockpit airplane up the Amazon River.

In 1933, Richard du Pont partnered with Hawley Bowlus to set up the Bowlus-du Pont Sailplane Company, a glider manufactory in San Fernando, California. Du Pont made a record flight in one of their sailplanes on September 21, 1933, taking off from Afton Mountain into the Rockfish Gap and gliding 121.6 miles to Frederick, Maryland. The firm remained in business for only a few years, ceasing operations in September 1936.

On March 19, 1934, Richard du Pont married Helena Allaire Crozer (usually known as Allaire du Pont). They had two children, Richard Chichester du Pont, Jr. and Lana du Pont.

Richard du Pont and his older brother Alexis Felix du Pont, Jr. (1905–1996) established the forerunner to US Airways and now renamed American Airlines, the largest airline in the world. Their All American Aviation Company was at first an airmail service that eventually serviced parts of Pennsylvania, West Virginia, Kentucky, and Ohio. In 1949, the company began passenger service and changed its name to All American Airways and then to Allegheny Airlines.

During World War II, the United States War Department created the American Glider Program. After the death of the program's director, Lewin B. Barringer, Richard du Pont was made a Special Assistant to General "Hap" Arnold and placed in charge of the glider program at Army Air Force Headquarters. On September 11, 1943, at March Air Field in California, Richard du Pont was killed when the experimental XCG-16 glider in which he was a passenger crashed during a demonstration flight. After bailing out of the aircraft his parachute failed. His brother, Major Alexis Felix du Pont, Jr., was appointed to succeed him as head of the glider program.

== Legacy ==
Du Pont was a three-time U.S. National Soaring Champion; since 1947 the Richard C. du Pont Memorial Trophy has been awarded annually to the U.S. National Open Class Soaring Champion. An American Legion post in Claymont, Delaware is named in his honor. Upon the creation of the Soaring Hall of Fame in 1954 by the Soaring Society of America, Richard du Pont was part of the first group of inductees.

In December 1943, he was posthumously awarded the Distinguished Service Medal.

The Richard Dupont Fellowship (DuPont Fellows program under the DuPont/MIT Alliance) has been awarded for studies in Aeronautics and Astronautics.

His widow Allaire du Pont operated Woodstock Farm in Chesapeake City, Maryland and owned Bohemia Stable, best known for the Hall of Fame thoroughbred racehorse, Kelso. She died January 6, 2006, at her Woodstock Farm near Chesapeake City, Maryland.
