= A. Felix du Pont Jr. =

American businessman, aviator and philanthropist

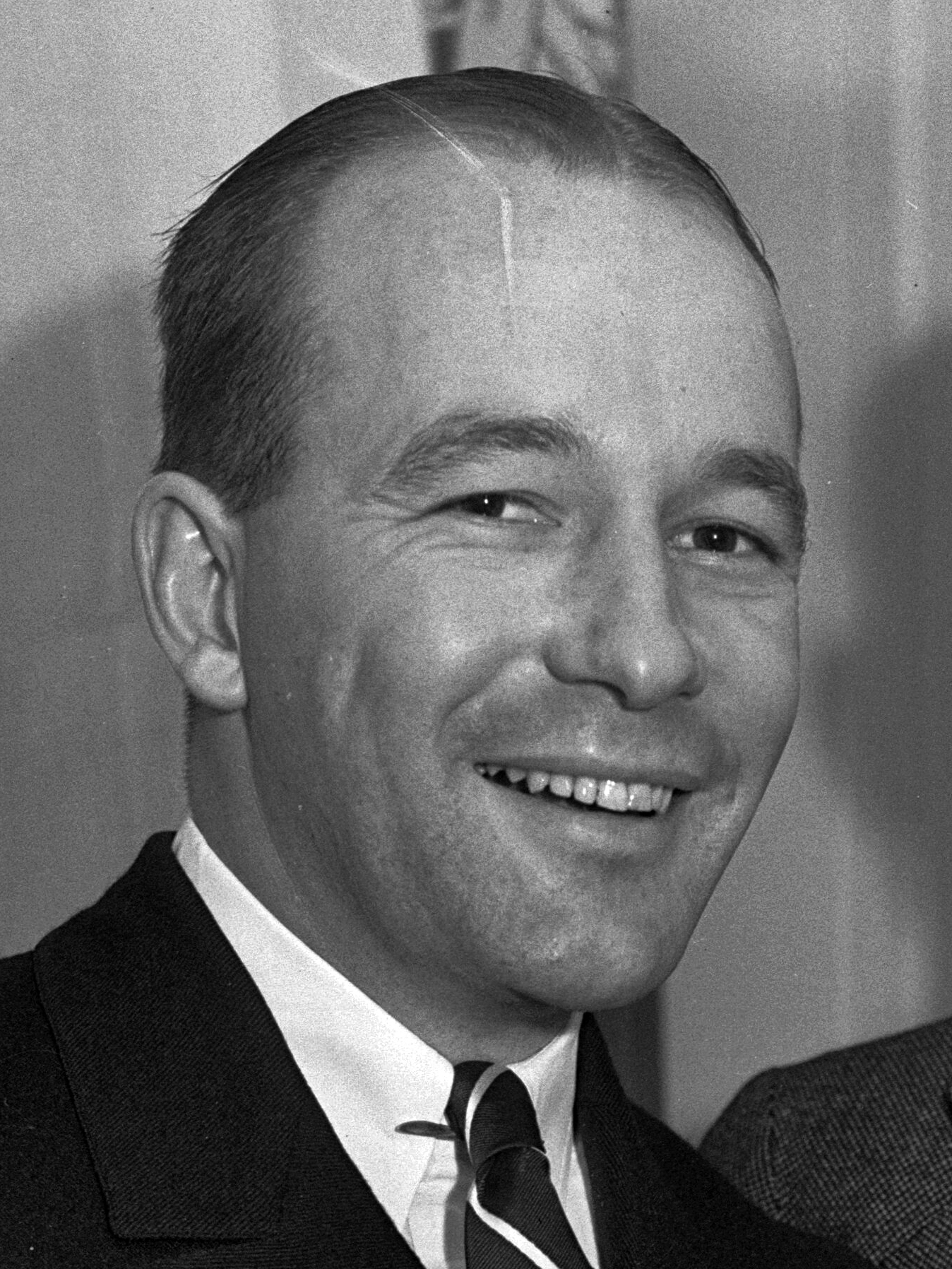
- Du Pont in 1935
- Born: Alexis Felix du Pont Jr. October 2, 1905; Wilmington, Delaware
- Died: December 30, 1996 (aged 91); Wilmington, Delaware
- Education: Princeton University (B.A., 1929)
- Occupations: Aviator, airline/helicopter company owner, soldier, philanthropist
- Known for: All American Aviation Company
- Board member of: All American Aviation Company, Piasecki Helicopter Corp., Long Island Aviation Country Club, St. Andrew's School
- Spouses: Eleanor Hoyt (1931-1945); Marka Truesdale (1974-1993)
- Parents: A. Felix du Pont Sr.; Mary Richards Chichester du Pont

Alexis Felix du Pont Jr. (October 2, 1905 – December 30, 1996) was an American aviation pioneer, soldier, philanthropist, and a member of the prominent du Pont family.

== Biography ==
Known as Felix, he was born in Wilmington, Delaware on October 2, 1905, the son of Alexis Felix du Pont (1879–1948) and Mary Chichester (1878–1965). He developed an interest in aviation as a boy and took up flying, something he would do well into his late eighties. He graduated from the United States Army Air Corps Flying School in 1928 and Princeton University, class of 1929. The following year, du Pont was hired as a test pilot for the Fokker Aircraft Company.

For five years, Felix du Pont worked for the family owned chemical behemoth DuPont and for a short time became involved in the investment business. With a lifelong interest in aviation, he partnered with brother Richard to found All American Aviation Company which became Allegheny Airlines and eventually US Airways (now part of American Airlines. He later was a vice president of the Piasecki Helicopter Corp. of which he and Laurance Rockefeller were early investors on its founding in 1946.

Felix du Pont married twice, first to Eleanor Hoyt and second to Marka Truesdale.

During World War II, du Pont served with Air Transport Command with an office at The Pentagon. He was then shipped overseas as part of Pacific Theater operations, assigned to combat training and director of glider operations. He retired from the military with the rank of lieutenant colonel.

On the death of his brother Richard in a glider accident in 1943, Felix du Pont was appointed to succeed him as head of the American Glider Program at Wright-Patterson Air Force Base.

The Chichester du Pont Foundation was incorporated in 1946 by Felix du Pont, Alice du Pont Mills, Lydia Chichester du Pont, and Mary Chichester du Pont Clark. The foundation, which remains in operation, is primarily involved in supporting youth with donations made to social service organizations for the direct benefit of children. In addition to his numerous charitable works and service on civic boards, Felix du Pont was a trustee of St. Andrew's School, founded by his father.

In the 1994, Forbes magazine listing of the richest Americans, Felix du Pont ranked No. 257.

He died on December 30, 1996. He was inducted posthumously into the Delaware Aviation Hall of Fame in 2006.

Children of Alexis Felix du Pont Jr. and Eleanor Hoyt:

- Katharine Hoyt du Pont Gahagan b. 5 August 1933 (living)
- Elaine Chichester du Pont b. 15 Nov 1934 (deceased)
- Alexis Felix du Pont III b. 14 Apr 1936, d. Jun 1943
- Michael Hoyt du Pont (living)

Child of Alexis Felix du Pont Jr. and Marka Truesdale:

- Christopher Truesdale du Pont (living)
