= RCTT =

RCTT may refer to:

- Tamshiyacu Tahuayo Community Reserve (Spanish: Regional Comunal Tamshiyacu Tahuayo), the original name of the Tamshiyacu Tahuayo Regional Conservation Area
- Republican Centre for Technology Transfer, a Belerusian non-government organisation
