= Republican Centre for Technology Transfer =

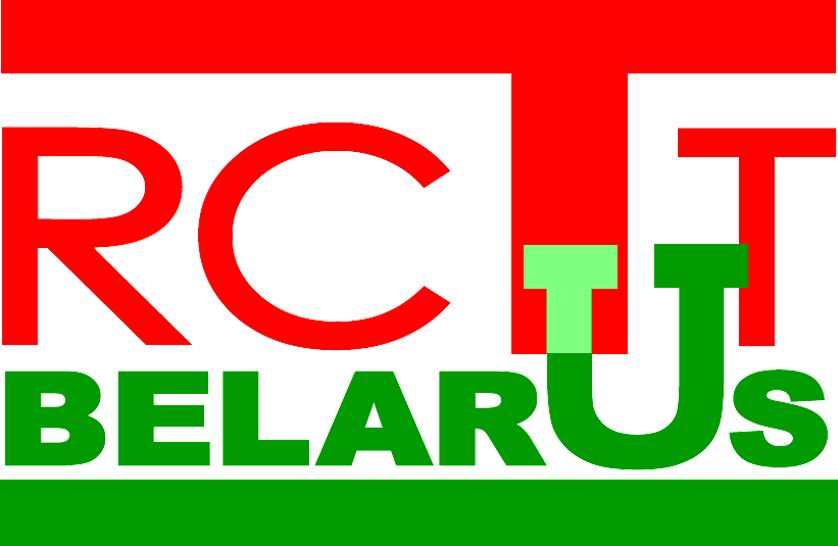
- Company type: NPO, NGO
- Industry: Open Innovation, Technology transfer
- Headquarters: Minsk
- Website: http://www.ictt.by

Republican Centre for Technology Transfer (RCTT) - association of government, business and NPO's engaged in technology transfer, or policy-making of the Republic of Belarus in the field of technology transfer. RCTT founded in May 2003, under the aegis of the State Committee on Science and Technologies of the Republic of Belarus (SCST), the National Academy of Sciences of Belarus, the United Nations Development Programme (UNDP) and the United Nations Industrial Development Organization (UNIDO). RCTT is a non-profit organization operating under the laws of the Republic of Belarus.

The main activity of RCTT is to promote cooperation between developers, entrepreneurs and investors, support information databases, serving clients in the technology transfer.

RCTT is consortium that includes the headquarters in Minsk, 5 regional offices and 30 branch offices, 90 foreign partners (EEN, NTTN, AUTM, CITTC, yet2.com, and others) in 23 countries, and 2 overseas field offices in China.
