= Ethel Roosevelt =

Ethel Roosevelt may refer to:

- Ethel du Pont, Ethel Roosevelt Warren née duPont, (1916–1965), wife of Franklin D. Roosevelt, Jr.
- Ethel Roosevelt Derby (1891–1977), daughter of President Theodore Roosevelt
