= Alice du Pont Mills =

American race horse breeder and owner

- Born: December 13, 1912; Wilmington, Delaware, United States
- Died: March 13, 2002 (aged 89)
- Occupations: Aviator, Racehorse owner/breeder, Philanthropist
- Board member of: Planned Parenthood, Chichester du Pont Foundation, Grayson-Jockey Club Research Foundation
- Spouse: James P. Mills
- Children: May Chichester, Phyllis Overton, James Paul Jr.
- Parent(s): A. Felix du Pont & Mary Chichester
- Relatives: Siblings: Alexis Felix Jr. (1905-1996); Lydia Chichester (1907-1958); Richard Chichester (1911-1943)
- Honors: Kentucky Thoroughbred Breeders' Association's Ladies' Sportsmanship Award (1970); Virginia Thoroughbred Owners and Breeders Association Outstanding Owner/Breeder Award (1991)

Alice Frances du Pont Mills (December 13, 1912 – March 13, 2002) was an American aviator, thoroughbred race horse breeder and owner, environmentalist, philanthropist and a member of the du Pont family.

== Biography ==
Born in Wilmington, Delaware, the daughter of A. Felix du Pont (1879–1948) and Mary Chichester (1878–1965), after graduating from Oldfields School in Glencoe, Maryland, the wealthy Alice du Pont pursued a wide variety of interests. Like her brothers, Felix and Richard, she too had a passion for flying. In 1932, she was only twenty years old when she and brother Richard flew an open-cockpit plane up the Amazon River.

In 1935, she married James Paul Mills (1908–1987) who shared her love of flying and with whom she had three children. Her daughter Phyllis married artist Jamie Wyeth.

Her grandson was Richard P. Mills (a.k.a. Grimnir Wotansvolk / G. Heretik, owner of the American National Socialist black metal record label and distro "Vinland Winds") who died in mysterious circumstances (drug overdose) on August 28, 2006.

During World War II, Ms du Pont Mills served as a volunteer flight instructor for United States military pilots at an airfield on Long Island, New York. With the war over, in 1946 she and her husband flew a single-engine plane from New York City to Buenos Aires, Argentina.

The Chichester du Pont Foundation was incorporated in 1946 by Alice du Pont Mills, A. Felix du Pont Jr., Lydia Chichester du Pont, and Mary Chichester du Pont Clark. The foundation, which remains in operation, is primarily involved in supporting youth with donations made to social service organizations for the direct benefit of children.

== Thoroughbred racing ==
In 1949, she and her husband settled on a country estate in Middleburg, Virginia, where they maintained Hickory Tree Farm and Stable, a thoroughbred breeding and racing operation. Her stable won numerous stakes races, notably in 1966 when her filly Glad Rags won a British Classic Race, the 1,000 Guineas Stakes. At the 1982 Keeneland yearling sale she bought the Windfields Farm colt, Devil's Bag. Trained by Woody Stephens, Devil's Bag was voted the Eclipse Award winner as American Champion Two-Year-Old Colt of 1983 and a favorite for the 1984 Kentucky Derby, However, the horse had to be retired after sustaining an injury. Devil's Bag was syndicated for US$36 million as a breeding sire, and produced more than 40 stakes winners before his death in 2005.

Through her involvement with thoroughbred horses, Alice du Pont Mills became a member of the Virginia Thoroughbred Association, Hickory Tree Farm and Stable elected a member of its Hall of Fame. She served as a trustee of the United States Thoroughbred Owners and Breeders Association, was an advisory trustee to the National Museum of Racing and Hall of Fame, and was a director of the Grayson-Jockey Club Research Foundation. A founding member of the Marion duPont Scott Equine Medical Center in Leesburg, Virginia, Alice du Pont Mills' cousin, Marion duPont Scott, was a significant owner/breeder in both flat and steeplechase racing.

Involved in a number of charitable works, Alice du Pont Mills was a member of the national board of directors of Planned Parenthood. A conservationist, she was an active advocate for the preservation and careful management of the environment and of natural resources, serving as founding member of Virginia's Bull Run Conservancy and the Piedmont Environmental Council and became a trustee of the Virginia Outdoors Foundation. Alice du Pont Mills died in Virginia in 2002.
