= A. Felix du Pont =

American businessman and philanthropist

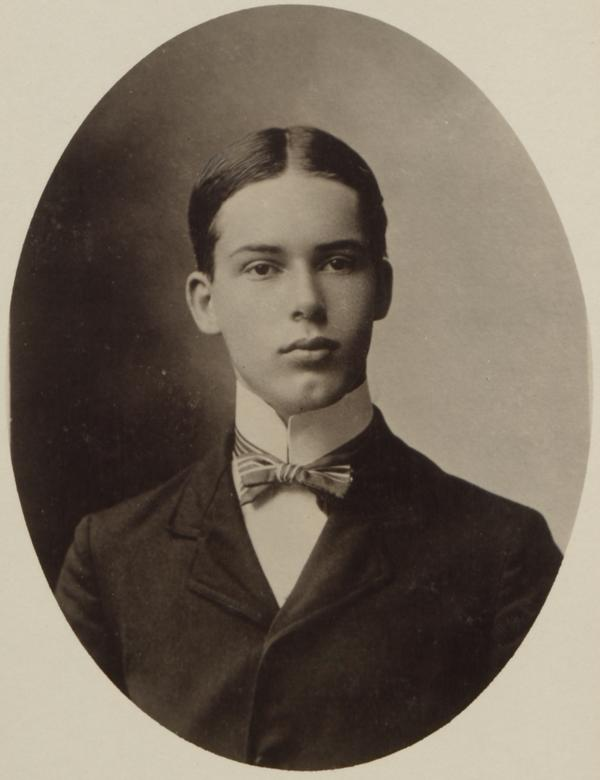
- Born: Alexis Felix du Pont; April 14, 1879; Wilmington, Delaware, US
- Died: June 29, 1948 (aged 69); Rehoboth Beach, Delaware, US
- Other name: Felix du Pont
- Education: University of Pennsylvania (1901)
- Occupations: Businessman, philanthropist
- Known for: Vice-President, E. I. du Pont de Nemours & Co., Founder, St. Andrew's School
- Political party: Democratic
- Board member of: DuPont, St. Andrew's School
- Spouses: 1) Mary Richards Chichester (1878-1965); 2) Ann Burton Marvel De Armond (1886-1963)
- Children: with Mary: Alexis Felix du Pont, Jr. (1905-1996); Lydia Chichester du Pont (1907-1958); Richard Chichester du Pont (1911-1943); Alice Frances du Pont Mills (1912-2002)
- Parent(s): Francis Gurney du Pont; Elise Wigfall Simons

Alexis Felix du Pont Sr. (April 14, 1879 – June 29, 1948) was a member of the American du Pont family who served as a vice president and director of E. I. du Pont de Nemours & Co. and a philanthropist who helped found St. Andrew's School in Middletown, Delaware.

== Biography ==
He was born on April 14, 1879, to Francis Gurney du Pont and Elise Wigfall Simons. He graduated from the University of Pennsylvania in 1901.

He started work at E. I. du Pont de Nemours & Co. in 1900 and was made director in 1915 and vice president in 1919.

Felix du Pont died on June 29, 1948, in Rehoboth Beach, Delaware.

== Marriage ==
In 1902, he married Mary R. Chichester. She was the daughter of Washington Bowie Chichester of Leesburg, Virginia. On September 3, 1937, they divorced in Reno, Nevada. Later that same day he married Ann Marvel of Rehoboth Beach, Delaware. She was the daughter of Judge David Marvel of the Superior Court in Wilmington, Delaware.

== Legacy ==
His son, Alexis Felix du Pont, Jr., co-founded the All American Aviation Company, predecessor of US Airways Group, Inc., which merged with AMR Corporation in 2013 to form the world's largest airline. In 1897, A. Felix du Pont, Sr. co-founded The University of Pennsylvania Band.
