= All American Aviation =

Airline of the United States (1937–1953)

- Founded: 1937; 89 years ago
- Commenced operations: March 7, 1939; 87 years ago
- Ceased operations: January 1, 1953; 73 years ago (rebranded as Allegheny Airlines)
- Hubs: Allegheny County Airport
- Fleet size: See Fleet
- Headquarters: Pittsburgh, Pennsylvania, United States
- Key people: Richard C. du Pont (President)
- Founder: Lytle Schuyler Adams (President)

All American Aviation was an airline company founded by Lytle Schooler Adams in 1937. It evolved over the decades to become Allegheny Airlines, then USAir and subsequently US Airways, with the latter's merger with American Airlines in 2013 creating the largest airline in the world.

== History ==
All American Aviation was founded in 1937 as a patent holding company. Its sister company, Tri-State Aviation, was founded on the same date, serving as the physical operating company. Founder Lytle Schooler Adams was the first president of both companies.

Adams had started experimenting with an airmail pick-up system in 1927, developing numerous patents on the system, which he rolled into All American Aviation in 1937. Initial flights of the airline pick-up service were made by a Stinson Reliant single engine high-wing monoplane. Mail containers were suspended from ropes or cables suspended from two poles. The aircraft swooped down with a suspended hook hanging below and snagged the rope or cable. This was further developed in a system that could pick up personnel.

The du Pont family brothers Richard C. du Pont and Alexis Felix du Pont, Jr. bought stock in the company in 1938—on the same date as a bill was passed in Congress to enable the U.S. Post Office to start large scale experimentation on the airmail pick-up system. Through some manipulations, the du Ponts were able to acquire majority stock and voted Richard du Pont as the new president.

Actual service did not commence until 1939. The pioneering experimental airmail pickup service was built on routes radiating from a hub at Pittsburgh, Pennsylvania, from which the airline provided service throughout the Ohio River valley.

Originally headquartered at Allegheny County Airport near Pittsburgh, All American moved its headquarters in 1949 to Washington National Airport in Arlington, Virginia, while retaining the Pittsburgh hub and operations.

All American received a certificate of public convenience and necessity from the Civil Aeronautics Board for regular passenger, mail and express service. Concurrent with the introduction of passenger service, the company changed its name in 1949 to All American Airways. This should not be confused with the irregular air carrier also known as All American Airways which later changed its name to Saturn Airways.

Through the years, the company grew and the name was again changed, becoming Allegheny Airlines on January 1, 1953, USAir on October 28, 1979, and US Airways on November 12, 1996. Following its 2013 merger with American Airlines, the US Airways brand was phased out by 2016 as planes, uniforms, and other assets were steadily rebranded to American Airlines.

== Fleet ==
Pre World War II

- Stinson SM-1D-300
- Stinson SR-10C (4)

Post World War II

- Douglas DC-3
- Convair 580

== See also ==
- List of defunct airlines of the United States
- Fulton surface-to-air recovery system
