= Coleman Dupont Donaldson =

American physicist and engineer

- Born: September 22, 1922; Philadelphia, Pennsylvania
- Died: August 7, 2009 (aged 86); Newport News, Virginia
- Education: Rensselaer Polytechnic Institute, Princeton University
- Scientific career
- Fields: Fluid mechanics
- Doctoral advisor: Luigi Crocco

Coleman Dupont Donaldson (September 22, 1922 – August 7, 2009) was a fluid physicist and aeronautical engineer who specialized in turbulent flow and computational fluid dynamics. He made broad contributions during his career in turbulent transport, supersonic flow, and armor.

== Biography ==
In 1942 he received a bachelor's degree from Rensselaer Polytechnic Institute. Afterwards he worked for the National Advisory Committee for Aeronautics (NACA) at the Langley Memorial Aeronautical Laboratory. While serving in the Army Air Corps in 1945–1946 he was assigned to Bell Aircraft, where he worked on the development of the X-1 and X-2. Afterwards he worked at NACA again and completed his doctorate at Princeton under Luigi Crocco in 1957. He was elected to the National Academy of Engineering in 1979. He was a member of the Du Pont family and a grandson of T. Coleman du Pont.
