= Ben duPont =

American businessman

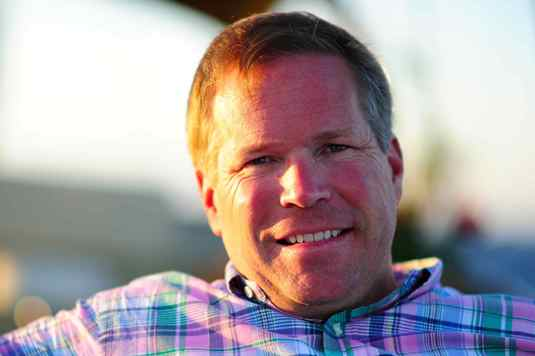
- Born: Benjamin Franklin du Pont; January 14, 1964 (age 62)
- Education: Tufts University (BS)
- Occupation: Business executive
- Known for: Founder of yet2Ventures and yet2.com

Benjamin Franklin duPont is an American businessman known for founding the companies yet2.com and yet2Ventures. He is a member of the Du Pont family. He co-founded and is a partner at Chartline Capital Partners.

== Biography ==
Benjamin Franklin duPont was born in 1964; his father was the politician Pierre S. du Pont IV. He graduated from Tufts University with a Bachelor of Science in mechanical engineering in 1986.

=== Career ===
In 1986 duPont began working for DuPont, a company the du Ponts founded in 1802. He held a number of management positions in the company over 13 years. In 1999, he left DuPont to cofound yet2.com with Phillip Stern, a U.S. patent distribution firm in Cambridge, Massachusetts. DuPont became the company's president. After a year of development the firm had raised $24 million in financing and was described by Forbes magazine as a "quasi-clearinghouse for technology developed by corporations" where both inventors and companies can post their patents for sale or lease to other firms.

In December 2002, yet2.com was acquired by Scipher, but the next year duPont reacquired it from Scipher and became its executive director.

DuPont has been director of Vianix, Speakman, Longwood Gardens Inc., Gigsky, Inc, and Bessemer Trust Delaware. In 2015, he co-founded Zip Code Wilmington.

== Personal life ==
In August 2001, Ben married Laura Leigh Lemole, a jewelry designer. They have two children.
