= Stephen N. Shulman =

American attorney (1933–2011)

Stephen Neal Shulman
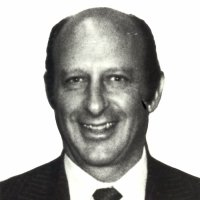

2nd Chair of the Equal Employment Opportunity Commission
- In office September 14, 1966 – July 1, 1967
- President: Lyndon B. Johnson
- Preceded by: Franklin Delano Roosevelt Jr.
- Succeeded by: Clifford Alexander Jr.

General Counsel of the Air Force
- In office 1965–1966
- Preceded by: Gerritt W. Wesselink
- Succeeded by: J. William Doolittle

Personal details
- Born: April 6, 1933 New Haven, Connecticut, U.S.
- Died: January 22, 2011 (aged 77) Washington, D.C., U.S.
- Relations: Harry Shulman (father)
- Children: 3
- Education: Harvard University (BA); Yale University (LLB)

Stephen Neal Shulman (April 6, 1933 – January 22, 2011) was an American attorney known for representing Egil Krogh during the Watergate scandal. He also served as General Counsel of the Air Force in from 1965 to 1966 and Chairman of the Equal Employment Opportunity Commission from 1966 to 1967.

== Early life and education ==
Stephen Neal Shulman was born April 6, 1933, in New Haven, Connecticut. His father was Harry Shulman, a Jewish immigrant from the Russian Empire who served as a professor and eventual dean at Yale Law School. Stephen Shulman earned a Bachelor of Arts degree from Harvard College, graduating in 1954. After college, he worked in labor relations at Bendix Aviation. He then attended Yale Law School, where he was editor-in-chief of the Yale Law Journal and earned his LL.B. in 1958.

== Career ==
After law school, Shulman spent 1958 and 1959 as the law clerk of John Marshall Harlan, an Associate Justice of the Supreme Court of the United States. After completing his clerkship, he became an associate attorney at Covington & Burling in Washington, D.C. In May 1960, he became Assistant United States Attorney for the District of Columbia.

In February 1961, Shulman became the executive assistant of United States Secretary of Labor Arthur Goldberg. During this time, he served for a time as Vice Chairman of the President's Committee on Equal Employment Opportunity. The next year, he became Deputy Assistant Secretary of Defense for Civilian Personnel and Industrial Relations. In 1964, civil rights was added to his responsibilities. In 1965, President of the United States Lyndon Johnson named Shulman General Counsel of the Air Force. In 1966, President Johnson named Shulman the second Chairman of the Equal Employment Opportunity Commission, an office he held from September 14, 1966, until July 1, 1967.

Upon leaving government service in 1967, Shulman founded his own law firm, Kane, Shulman and Schlei. On January 1, 1971, this firm was merged into the firm of Cadwalader, Wickersham & Taft. During the Watergate scandal, Shulman represented Egil Krogh, head of the White House Plumbers. Krogh later told Bob Woodward that Shulman was "instrumental in helping me determine that what I had done was not only illegal but morally wrong." Shulman convinced the United States Department of Justice to enter into a plea bargain with Krogh in 1973. After the Krogh case, Shulman's career focused on tax and employment litigation. In the 1980s, he represented the country of Guinea in a long-running international arbitration case. Shulman also became managing partner of Cadwalader's Washington, D.C. office, holding the position until his retirement in the late-1990s.

== Personal life ==
Shulman and his wife, Sandra (née Still) had three sons. Shulman died of cancer at Georgetown University Hospital on January 22, 2011. He was 77 years old.

== See also ==
- List of law clerks for the ninth seat of the Supreme Court of the United States

Government offices
Preceded by N/A	General Counsel of the Air Force; 1965	Succeeded by N/A
Preceded by Franklin Delano Roosevelt, Jr.	Chairman of the Equal Employment Opportunity Commission; 1966–1967	Succeeded by Clifford Alexander, Jr.
