= 1949 New York's 20th congressional district special election =

- May 17, 1949

New York's 20th congressional district
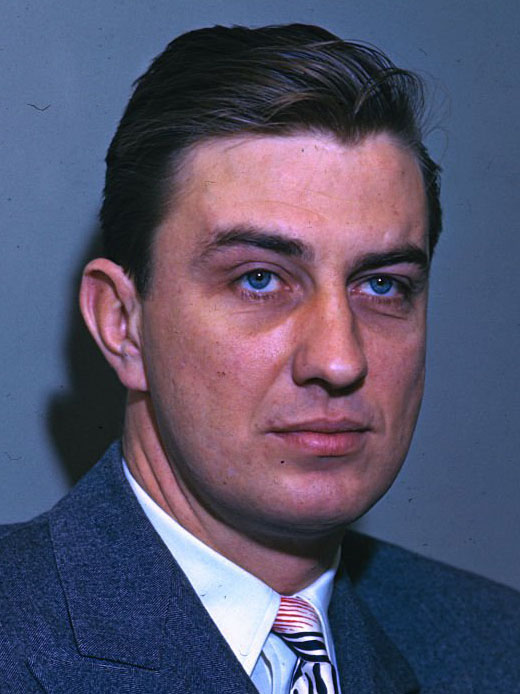

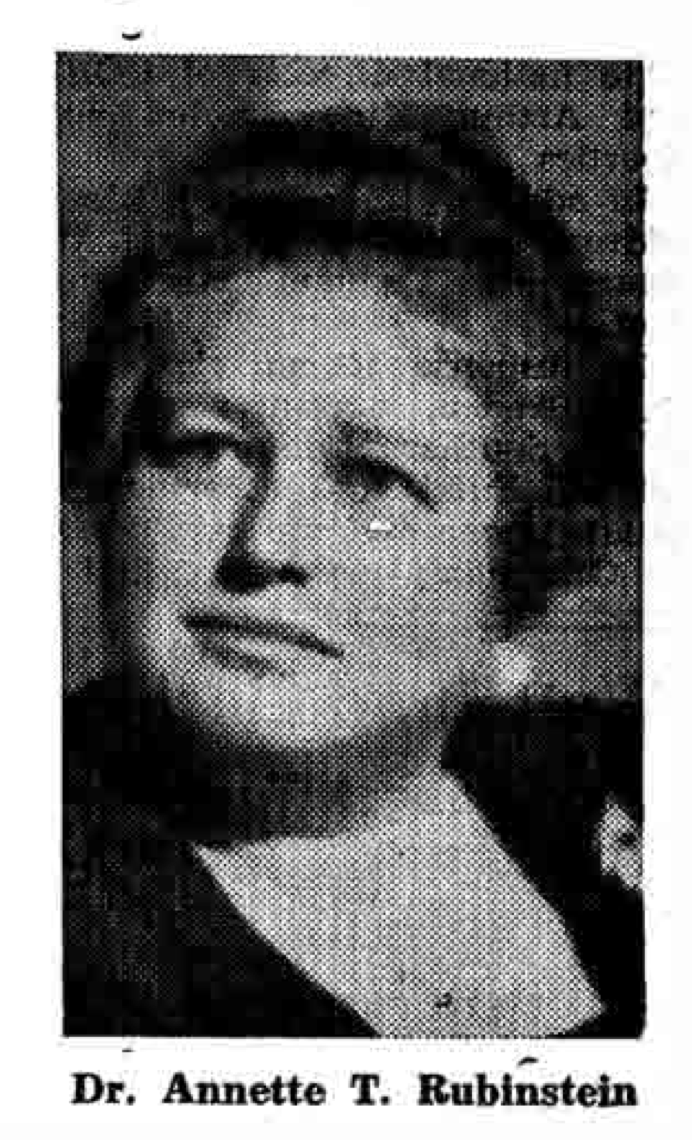
Nominee	Franklin D. Roosevelt Jr.	Benjamin Shalleck
Party	Liberal	Democratic
Alliance	Four Freedoms
Popular vote	40,822	24,352
Percentage	50.68%	30.23%
Nominee	William H. McIntyre	Annette Rubinstein
Party	Republican	American Labor
Popular vote	10,026	5,348
Percentage	12.45%	6.64%
U.S. Representative before election
Sol Bloom
Democratic
Elected U.S. Representative
Franklin D. Roosevelt Jr.
Liberal

The 1949 New York's 20th congressional district special election was held on May 17, 1949, to elect the United States representative from New York's 20th congressional district. Franklin D. Roosevelt Jr. won the election as the nominee of the Liberal and Four Freedoms parties.

== Background ==
Sol Bloom, a member of Tammany Hall, was elected to the United States House of Representatives in 1923, and served fourteen terms. He represented New York's 20th congressional district at the time of his death on March 7, 1949. A majority of the district's residents were Jewish and a large amount were Irish. There were 138,054 registered voters in the district.

Hugo Rogers, the borough president of Manhattan and a leader in Tammany Hall, hoped that Governor Thomas Dewey would not call a special election and would instead leave the seat vacant until the 1950 election. The American Labor Party filed suit 28 days after Bloom's death for Dewey to schedule a special election. On April 7, Dewey called for an election to be held on May 17.

== Nominations ==
=== American Labor ===
Annette Rubinstein, a member of the Communist Party USA, was nominated by the American Labor Party. She announced her candidacy at a memorial in Madison Square Garden for the fourth anniversary of Franklin D. Roosevelt's death.

=== Liberal ===
The Liberal Party of New York endorsed Franklin D. Roosevelt Jr. the same day of his announcement, formally gave him its nomination on April 13, and Roosevelt accepted it on April 19. Marshall Field III, Joseph E. Davies, Henry Morgenthau Jr., Tallulah Bankhead, and Douglas Fairbanks Jr. donated to his campaign.

Roosevelt threatened to run as the nominee of the Four Freedoms Party if he lost the Democratic nomination. 3,000 signatures were required to place him onto the ballot and the Liberal Party claimed that it gathered 11,000-12,000 of the 26,000 signatures to give Roosevelt the Four Freedoms Party ballot line. On May 6, Tammany Hall filed a lawsuit to remove the Four Freedoms Party from the ballot, but withdrew it on May 9.

=== Democratic ===
- Owen McGivern, member of the New York State Assembly
- Franklin D. Roosevelt Jr., son of President Franklin D. Roosevelt
- Benjamin Shalleck

Roosevelt, at the urging of Alex Rose, announced his campaign on March 15 despite living in Woodbury, which was outside of the district. Charles Horowitz, a former member of Tammany Hall, was Roosevelt's campaign manager. The Republican Party challenged Roosevelt's eligibility to vote in the special election, although he would still be allowed to run, due to his residency, but the New York Supreme Court ruled in Roosevelt's favor.

Tammany Hall opposed Roosevelt and had Benjamin Shalleck run against him, believing that a Jew would fare better. Shalleck's campaign was managed by Abraham Kaplan. Mayor Erastus Corning 2nd attacked Roosevelt's candidacy as an attempt to start a political dynasty in control of the New York State Democratic Party. Roosevelt claimed that Frank Costello used his influence in Tammany Hall to stop him from receiving the Democratic nomination. Shalleck was given the nomination after a two-hour session, far longer than the normal few minutes, on April 11, and district leader Robert B. Blaikie, who opposed him and supported Roosevelt, walked out in protest.

=== Republican ===
William McIntyre was nominated by the Republicans and Alexander Wolf managed his campaign.

== Results ==
Roosevelt won the election with a majority of the vote. He raised $14,121 and spent $15,512 while Shalleck raised $2,465 and spent $439.

1949 New York's 20th congressional district special election
Party	Candidate	Votes	%	±%
Liberal	Franklin D. Roosevelt Jr.	31,037	38.53%	
Four Freedoms	Franklin D. Roosevelt Jr.	9,785	12.15%	
Total	Franklin D. Roosevelt Jr.	40,822	50.68%	
Democratic	Benjamin Shalleck	24,352	30.23%	
Republican	William H. McIntyre	10,026	12.45%	
American Labor	Annette Rubinstein	5,348	6.64%	
Total votes		80,548	100.00%	

== Endorsements ==
McIntyre endorsements

Federal officials

- William L. Pfeiffer, member of the United States House of Representatives from New York's 42nd congressional district (1949–1951)
Roosevelt endorsements

Federal officials

- Hubert Humphrey, member of the U.S. Senate from Minnesota (1949–1964; 1971–1978)
- John F. Kennedy, member of the U.S. House of Representatives from Massachusetts's 11th congressional district (1947–1953)
- Henry Morgenthau Jr., 52nd United States Secretary of the Treasury (1934–1945)
- Robert F. Wagner, member of the U.S. Senate from New York (1927–1949)

State officials

- Chester B. Bowles, 78th Governor of Connecticut (1949–1951)
- Herbert H. Lehman, 45th Governor of New York (1933–1942)
- Nathan Straus Jr., member of the New York State Senate (1921–1926)

Local officials

- William O'Dwyer, 100th Mayor of New York City (1946–1950)

Organizations

- Amalgamated Clothing Workers of America
- Brotherhood of Sleeping Car Porters
- Congress of Industrial Organizations
- International Ladies Garment Workers Union
- New York State Young Democratic Club

Newspapers

- The New York Times

Notable individuals

- Mary McLeod Bethune, civil rights activist
- Fannie Hurst, novelist
Rubinstein endorsements

Federal officials

- Leo Isacson, member of the United States House of Representatives from New York's 24th congressional district (1948–1949)
- Vito Marcantonio, member of the United States House of Representatives from New York (1935–1937; 1939–1951)
- Henry A. Wallace, 33rd Vice President of the United States (1941–1945)
Shalleck endorsements

Federal officials

- J. Howard McGrath, member of the United States Senate from Rhode Island (1947–1949)

State officials

- Harold I. Panken, member of the New York State Senate (1947–1953)

Party officials

- Paul Fitzpatrick, chair of the New York State Democratic Party
- J. Howard McGrath, chair of the Democratic National Committee (1947–1949)

Organizations

- Democratic Congressional Campaign Committee
Declined to endorse

Organizations

- American Federation of Labor

== Works cited ==
- Mearns, John, ed. (1950). The New York Red Book (59 ed.). Williams Press.
- Moore, John; Preimesberger, Jon; Tarr, David, eds. (2001). Congressional Quarterly's Guide to U.S. Elections. Congressional Quarterly. ISBN 1-56802-602-1.
- Soyer, Daniel (2012). "'Support the Fair Deal in the Nation; Abolish the Raw Deal in the City': The Liberal Party in 1949". New York History. 93 (2). Cornell University Press: 147–81. JSTOR 23645398.
