= Richard C. du Pont Memorial Trophy =

The Richard C. du Pont Memorial Trophy is an American competitive award given annually by the Soaring Society of America to the U.S. National Open Class Soaring Champion, as determined at the annual U.S. National Open Class Soaring Championship.

First awarded in 1930 as the "Edward S. Evans Trophy," the current trophy was donated to the Soaring Society of America in 1947 by Mrs. Allaire du Pont in memory of her husband, Richard C. du Pont, U.S. National Soaring Champion in 1934, 1935 and 1937 who died in the crash of an experimental military glider on September 11, 1943.

== See also ==
- List of aviation awards
