= General Airborne Transport XCG-16 =

XCG-16
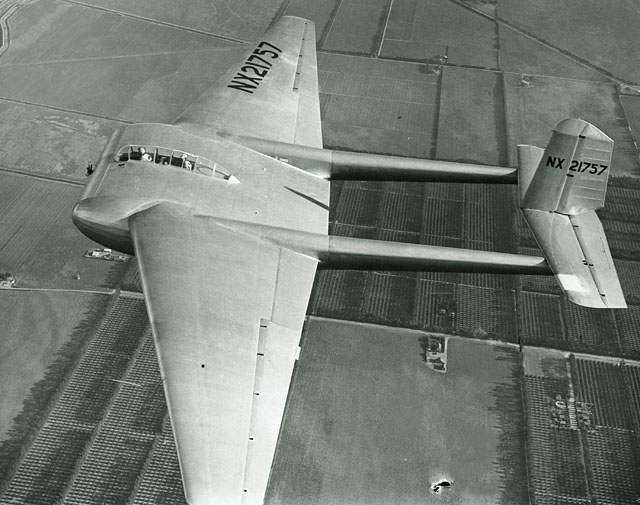
- The XCG-16 flying over Ohio.

General information
- Type: Military transport glider
- National origin: United States
- Manufacturer: General Airborne Transport
- Number built: 1x 1/2 scale MC-1, 1x MC-1, 1x XCG-16

History
- First flight: 11 September 1943

The XCG-16 was a military transport/assault glider ordered by the United States Army Air Forces (USAAF), from General Airborne Transport Co., for competition against the Waco CG-13A at Wright Field. The XCG-16’s preferred tow aircraft was the Lockheed Model 18 Lodestar.

== Design and development ==
Design of the CG-16 evolved from the lifting fuselage theories of Vincent Burnelli laid out in U.S. Patent No. 1,758,498, issued on 13 May 1930, which advocated the use of "lifting fuselages" providing a high proportion of the total lift. To enter a competition at Wright Field for a new assault glider for the USAAF, Hawley Bowlus and Albert Criz designed a Burnelli style lifting fuselage assault glider as the Bowlus-Criz MC-1.

To prove the concept and aerodynamic qualities Bowlus designed a 1:2 scale prototype, which flew successfully. The flight tests of the 1:2 scale MC-1 maintained confidence in the full-sized glider.

A contract for three MC-1 gliders, two flyable and one for static testing, was given to the Airborne and General aircraft company, which had been formed by Bowlus and Criz. This company soon transformed into the General Airborne Transport company, which built the full sized MC-1 gliders with the military designation XCG-16.

Flight tests of the full sized MC-1, registered to the Albert Criz company on 19 July 1943 as NX21757, commenced at March Field, California, on 11 September 1943, but tragedy struck on a demonstration flight with Richard Chichester du Pont, special assistant to Gen. Hap Arnold; Col. Ernest Gabel, another glider specialist on the staff of the Chief of Staff of the Air Force, and C. C. Chandler, thrice soaring champion aboard. Inadequately secured ballast came loose when the glider flew through the Lockheed C-60 tow plane's propwash, causing a catastrophic rearward shift in the center of gravity. The now uncontrollable MC-1A released from tow and entered an unrecoverable flat spin. Three of the crew and passengers jumped out, but only two survived the parachute jump.

In spite of all the design problems and the MC-1 crash, a contract was approved on 13 November 1943 for two test flight articles and one static test article of the MC-1 glider designated as the USAAF XCG-16. Only one XCG-16, (44-76193), was manufactured and tested, demonstrating good flying qualities, but major issues with military equipment and procedures precluded the CG-16 from a production contract, as it did not meet military expectations as a combat glider. The contract for all remaining work on the CG-16 was cancelled on 30 November 1944.

== Variants ==
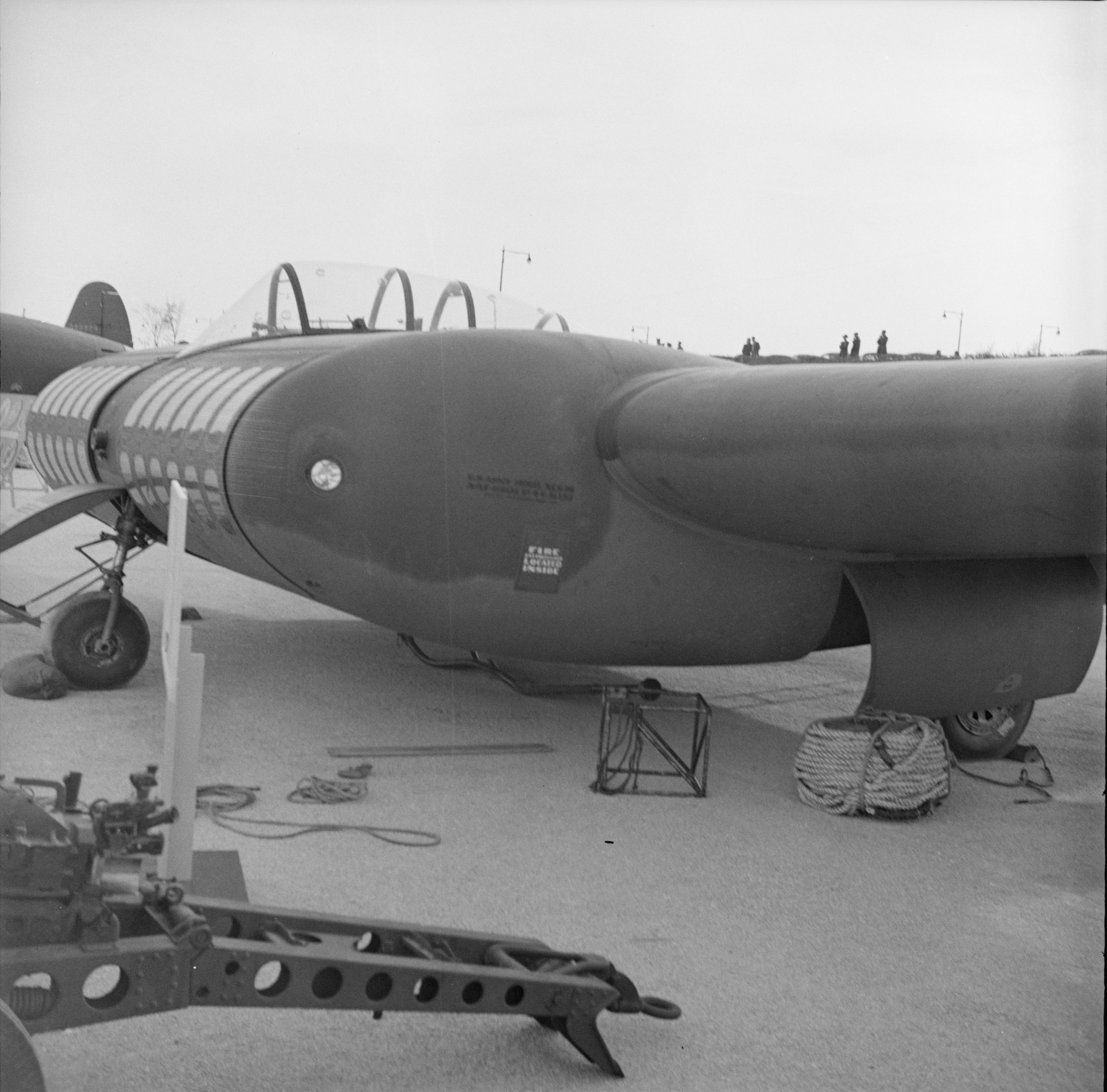
XCG-16 in October, 1944

Bowlus-Criz MC-1 half-scale
A flying 1:2 scale model of the MC-1/XCG-16. Successful flight trials proved the aerodynamic qualities of the MC-1. After completion of CG-16 related flying the 1:2 scale MC-1 was converted to a flying wing by Don Mitchell, one of Hawley Bowlus' friends and a colleague at Bowlus Sailplanes.
Airborne and General MC-1
The full-scale civilian prototype of the CG-16, destroyed on its second flight during a demonstration flight.
General Airborne Transport XCG-16
Three prototypes of the military XCG-16 were ordered, but only one was completed as 44-76193. Trials revealed major deficiencies in the ability of the CG-16 to fulfill the intended mission, despite good flying qualities.

== Specifications ==
Data from indianamilitary.org

General characteristics

- Crew: Two pilots
- Capacity: 42 troops or 10,050 lb (4,570 kg) of cargo
- Length: 48 ft 4 in (14.72 m)
- Wingspan: 91 ft 10 in (27.98 m)
- Height: 18 ft 4 in (5.58 m)
- Wing area: 1,139 sq ft (105.9 m^{2})
- Aspect ratio: 7.4
- Empty weight: 9,480 lb (4,310 kg)
- Gross weight: 19,540 lb (8,880 kg)

Performance

- Maximum speed: 220 mph (354 km/h, 190 kn)
