= Ethel du Pont =

American heiress and socialite

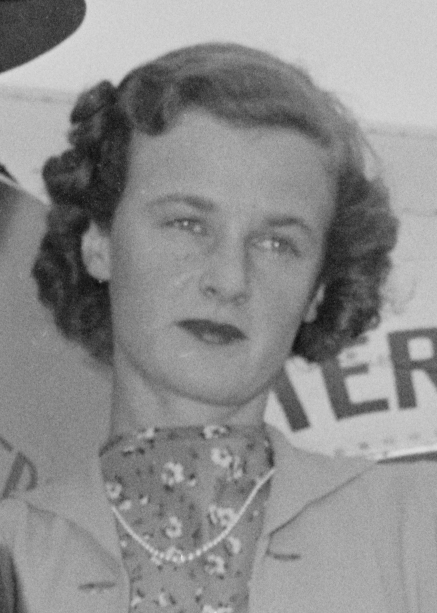
- Du Pont in 1937
- Born: January 30, 1916; Wilmington, Delaware, U.S.
- Died: May 25, 1965 (aged 49); Grosse Pointe Farms, Michigan, U.S.
- Cause of death: Suicide
- Education: Ethel Walker School
- Spouses: Franklin D. Roosevelt Jr. (m. 1937; div. 1949) Benjamin S. Warren, Jr. (m. 1950)
- Children: 3, including Franklin III
- Parents: Eugene du Pont Jr.; Ethel Pyle
- Relatives: Du Pont family

Ethel du Pont Roosevelt-Warren (January 30, 1916 – May 25, 1965) was an American heiress and socialite. She was also a member of the du Pont family. Her first husband was Franklin D. Roosevelt Jr., a son of the 32nd U.S. president Franklin D. Roosevelt and First Lady Eleanor Roosevelt.

== Early life ==
Ethel du Pont was born on January 30, 1916, in Wilmington, Delaware, the eldest child of Eugene du Pont Jr. and Ethel Pyle. She was a granddaughter of Eugene du Pont (1840–1902), the first head of DuPont, who saw the corporation into the 20th century. Her siblings were Aimée du Pont, Nicholas R. du Pont, and Eugene du Pont III.

She was raised at Owl's Nest, the family's estate in Greenville, Delaware, attended Misses Hebb's School in Wilmington and graduated from the Ethel Walker School in Simsbury, Connecticut.

== Personal life ==
On June 30, 1937, she married Franklin Delano Roosevelt, Jr. (1914–1988), a son of sitting President Franklin D. Roosevelt and First Lady Anna Eleanor Roosevelt, and grand-nephew of President Theodore Roosevelt. They had two sons:

- Franklin Delano Roosevelt III (born 1938)
- Christopher du Pont Roosevelt (born 1941)

The couple separated and formally divorced in 1949. In December 1950, Ethel du Pont Roosevelt married prominent Detroit lawyer Benjamin S. Warren, Jr. Together, they had a son:

- Benjamin S. Warren III (born 1954)

=== Death ===
Ethel du Pont was 49 years old when she committed suicide on May 25, 1965. She had been under psychiatric care several times in the years preceding her death and spent time at the Silver Hill Foundation, a hospital in New Canaan, Connecticut. Her death took place a few months before her son Christopher's wedding in June 1965, while she and her husband were separated, and while her son, Benjamin, then 10 years old, was away at boarding school.

Afterward, her family endowed the Harvard Medical School Ethel Dupont-Warren Fellowship Award for research in Psychiatry. As of 2023, the fellowship continues to support the salary of 3 to 4 young research psychiatrists per year.
