= James P. Mills =

American investment banker and philanthropist

- Born: 1909
- Died: 1987 (aged 77–78)
- Occupations: Investment banker Philanthropist; Thoroughbred owner Polo player
- Spouse: Alice du Pont Mills
- Children: Mrs. William Abel-Smith; Mrs. James Wyeth; James P. Mills Jr.
- Honors: Virginia Equine Hall of Fame; U.S. Polo Hall of Fame

James P. Mills (1909–1987) was an American investment banker, throughbred owner, polo player and philanthropist.

== Biography ==
=== Early life ===
James P. Mills was born in 1909 the son of Paul Denckla Mills (son of the late General Samuel Miles Mills, Commandant of the U. S. Military Academy at West Point) and Ellen Drexel Paul the granddaughter of Anthony J. Drexel. He graduated from Yale University, where he was the captain of the polo team in 1931 and 1932.

=== Banking career ===
He worked as an investment banker.

=== Equestrian interests ===
He owned Devil's Bag (1981–2005), Gone West (1984-2009), Believe It, Chumming and Akureyri. Additionally, he was a member of The Jockey Club, the National Steeplechase Association and the Virginia Equine Hall of Fame.

He was also an eight-goal polo player from the age of twenty-five. He played at the Meadowbrook Polo Club in Nassau County, New York and at the Aiken Polo Club in Aiken, South Carolina.

He won many championships. Both in 1929 and in 1933, he won the Silver Cup, also known as the Junior Championship Cup. In 1932, together with Elmer Boeseke (1895-1963), Winston Frederick Churchill Guest (1906-1982), Stewart Iglehart (1910-1993), Michael Grace Phipps (1910-1973), Joseph Cornelius Rathborne and William Post II, he competed in the Cup of the Americas in Palermo, Buenos Aires. The following year, in 1933, he won the U.S. Open Polo Championship in Seymour H. Knox II (1898-1990), Elbridge T. Gerry, Sr. (1909-1999), and Elmer Boeseke.

He also won the Monty Waterbury Cup twice: in 1933 and, three years later, in 1936. That year, in 1936, he was also a reserve for the International Polo Cup. The same year, together with Michael Phipps, Winston Guest and Robert E. Strawbridge, Jr. (1896-1986), he won the Hurlingham Champion Cup, the Roehampton Open Challenge Cup and the Coronation Cup.

Additionally, he wrote about polo for The Sportsman.

On February 17, 2012, he was inducted in the Museum of Polo and Hall of Fame in Lake Worth, Florida.

=== Philanthropy ===
He founded the Arthritis Foundation.

=== Personal life ===
In 1935, he married Alice du Pont Mills (1912-2012). They had two daughters and a son:

- Mimi Mills. She was married to William Abel-Smith.
- Phyllis Mills. She is married to painter Jamie Wyeth.
- James P. Mills Jr. He is married to Debbie Manoog Mills.

They lived on Hickory Tree Farm, which includes the Confederate Hall and is listed on the Virginia Landmarks Register, located in Middleburg, Virginia. He developed spinal arthritis in 1945, at the age of 37.

He died in 1987 in Winchester Hospital in Winchester, Massachusetts. His funeral ceremony took place at the Emanuel Church in Middleburg, Virginia.
