= Soaring Society of America =

Air gliding advocacy organization

The Soaring Society of America was founded in 1932

The Soaring Society of America (SSA) was founded in 1932 at the instigation of Warren E. Eaton to promote the sport of soaring in the USA and internationally. The first meeting was held in New York City in the McGraw–Hill Building on February 20, 1932. Its first objective was to hold a national soaring competition every year, but other roles were quickly adopted. In 1954, the Society created the Soaring Hall of Fame. Today the SSA, with a nationwide membership of over 10,000, is headquartered in Hobbs, New Mexico. It is a 501(c)(3) charity organization.

The SSA is led by the 17 members on its board of directors and its executive committee, ten of whom are regionally elected by the general membership and serve for three years. The other seven at-large directors are elected annually by the other directors. In addition to the executive meetings of the board, full SSA Board meetings are held twice a year and are open to the general membership. A support staff administers the daily business of the society from the headquarters offices.

The main responsibilities of the SSA are:

- Flight training and safety
- Technological research and development
- Services to members, such as organising SSA conventions and verifying badge claims
- Sponsorship and monitoring of competitions
- Promoting the sport and contact with the media
- Representing members' interests at meetings with Federal agencies in matters such as airspace
- Publishing Soaring magazine

== See also ==
- Richard C. du Pont Memorial Trophy
