= St. Andrew's School (Delaware) =

Private boarding school in the United States

- Schola Sancti Andreae
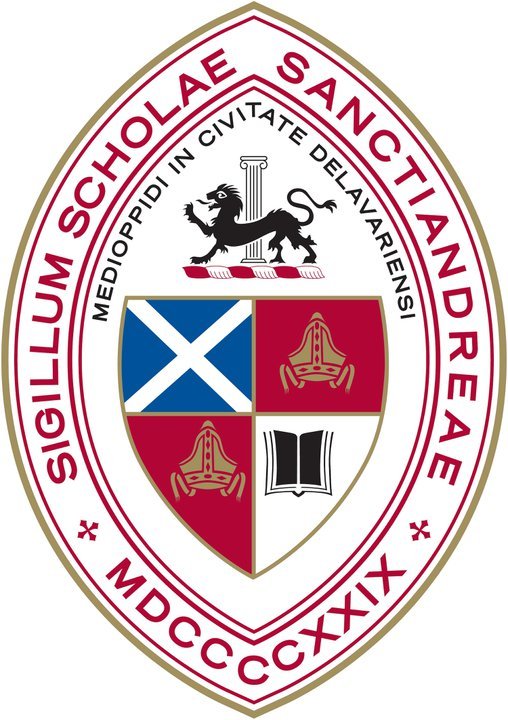

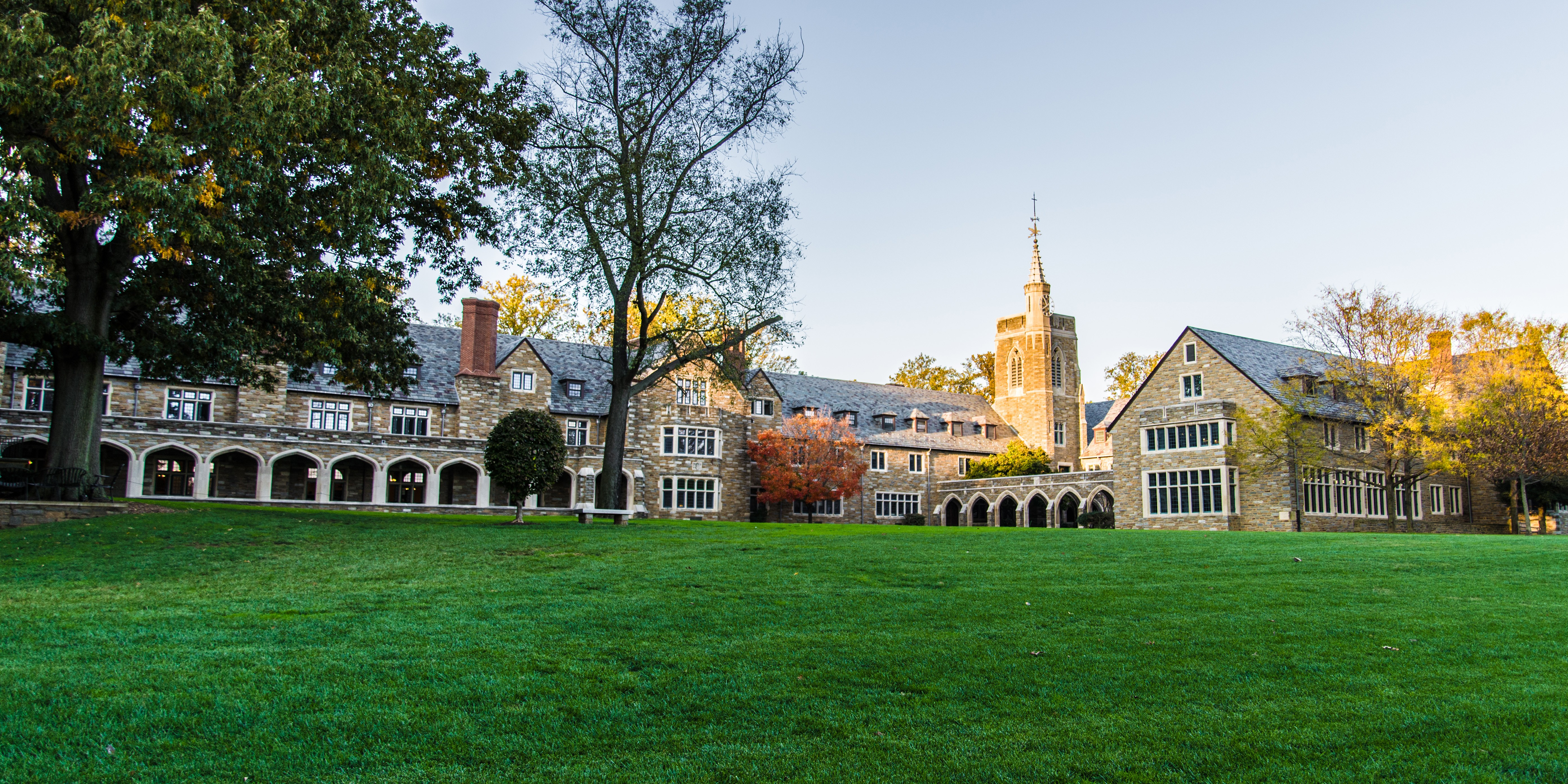

Location
- 350 Noxontown Rd; Middletown, Delaware 19709; United States; 39°25′59″N 75°41′19″W

Information
- Type: Private, boarding
- Motto: "Pistis Kai Episteme" ("Faith and Learning")
- Religious affiliation: Episcopal
- Established: 1929 (97 years ago)
- Founder: A. Felix du Pont
- CEEB code: 080095
- Head of School: Joy McGrath
- Faculty: 76
- Enrollment: 318
- Average class size: 12 students
- Student to teacher ratio: 5:1
- Campus size: 2,200 acres (890 ha)
- Colors: Cardinal red, white
- Athletics: 22 varsity interscholastic teams
- Athletics conference: Delaware Independent School Conference
- Mascot: Cardinal, saint, and griffin
- Newspaper: The Cardinal
- Yearbook: The Griffin
- Endowment: $220 million
- Website: standrews-de.org

St. Andrew's is a private, Episcopal, co-educational 100% boarding school near Middletown, Delaware. It is one of only three co-ed college preparatory schools in the United States where all students board. St. Andrew's has 318 students, and is highly selective, accepting 18% for the 2021–2022 school year.

Despite its relatively small student body, it has one of the largest secondary school campuses in the United States, spanning 2,200 acres. In 2024, Architectural Digest named St. Andrew's one of the "World's 9 Most Beautiful Boarding Schools." St. Andrew's offers 130 courses each year, in 10 disciplines.

== Tuition and financial aid ==
Since the founding of the school in 1929, St. Andrew’s has been a boarding school that meets 100% of demonstrated need. In 2020-2021, student tuition cost was $62,150 for the 2021–2022 school year, with 47% of students receiving some form of financial aid. St. Andrew's granted approximately $7.2 million in financial aid in 2022–2023, with a grant average of $49,102.

== History ==
St. Andrew's was founded in 1929 by A. Felix du Pont (1879–1948). He was a member of the du Pont family. The school was founded to provide a top education for boys of all socio-economic backgrounds, regardless of their families' ability to pay.

In 1927, du Pont initially raised the idea for an Episcopal school within the Diocese of Delaware to the diocese's bishop Rt. Rev. Philip Cook. After over two years of planning, the cornerstone was finally laid for the school on Saint Andrew's Day of 1929 (November 30). It would be nearly another year before the school would finally be ready to open it's doors to pupils, which it did on October 14, 1930.

The school was named after Saint Andrew, due to the school's lakeside location and the saint's association with fishermen.

St. Andrew's was originally a boys' school, but became coeducational in 1973.

It is a member of Mid-Atlantic Boarding School Group (MABS).

== Film appearances ==
The 1989 coming-of-age drama film Dead Poets Society directed by Peter Weir and starring Robin Williams, Robert Sean Leonard, and Ethan Hawke was filmed almost entirely on the school grounds. The school was known as Welton Academy in the movie.

It also served as the filming location of the young President Bartlet's boarding school in the television series The West Wing episode entitled "Two Cathedrals" (number 44).

== Campus facilities ==
=== Indoor athletic facilities ===
==== Sipprelle Field House ====
- Three basketball/volleyball courts
- Indoor track
- Performance studio & weight room
- Cardiovascular fitness room
- Sports medicine & rehab center
- Locker rooms for all teams plus faculty

==== William H. Cameron Gymnasium ====
- Durkin Fleischer Squash Center, which houses nine regulation squash courts
- Basketball court
- Indoor rowing facility
- 2,800 square-foot wrestling room

==== Genereaux Aquatic Center ====
- Six lane, 25 yard swimming pool

=== Outdoor athletic facilities ===
- 1,500 meter, six lane crew course on Noxontown Pond
- Kip duPont Boathouse
- 14 tennis courts
- More than eleven miles of cross-country trails
- Five soccer fields
- Four lacrosse fields
- Two field hockey fields
- Two baseball diamonds
- Practice and game football fields

== Notable alumni ==
- Bulent Atalay (1958), physicist and author
- Ben Bentil (2014), professional basketball player
- Dennis C. Blair (1964), former Director of National Intelligence for President Barack Obama and former United States Navy four-star admiral
- Eric Boateng (2005), British Olympian, member of the British Olympic Association's Athletes' Commission, professional basketball player, former center for Arizona State Sun Devils, 2005 McDonald's All-American and Gatorade State Athlete of the Year
- William R. Brownfield (1970), Assistant Secretary of State; United States Ambassador to Chile, Venezuela, Colombia
- Erin Burnett (1994), host of Erin Burnett OutFront on CNN
- Gardner Cadwalader (1966), Olympic rower, competed in the men's coxed four event at the 1968 Summer Olympics
- Moira Forbes (1997), publisher of ForbesWoman
- Roy Foster (1967), Irish academic, educator and historical writer
- Terrell L. Glenn Jr. (1976), American Anglican bishop
- Gregory Gourdet (1993), chef, author, restauranteur and Top Chef finalist
- Hume Horan (1951), diplomat and ambassador to five countries
- Doug James (1969), American songwriter, known for "How Am I Supposed to Live Without You"
- Lydia Kiesling (2001), American author and literary critic
- Chris Klebl (1990), cross-country skier, 11-time U.S. National Champion, Paralympic Gold Medalist
- Will McCormack (1992), actor and Oscar-winning filmmaker
- Steven Naifeh (1970), Pulitzer Prize-winning author and artist
- Janice Nevin (1977), president and CEO of ChristianaCare
- Maggie Rogers (2012), Grammy-nominated musician, singer-songwriter, and producer
- Peter Salett (1987), singer/songwriter and composer
- John Seabrook (1976), author and journalist for The New Yorker
- Dominic Seiterle (1994), Canadian rower, Olympic Gold Medalist
- Scott Siprelle (1981), venture capitalist and 2010 Republican candidate for Congress in New Jersey's 12th congressional district
- Cristina Stenbeck Fitzgibbons (1995), Swedish-American businesswoman
- Kirk Varnedoe (1963), American art historian and writer
- Loudon Wainwright Jr. (1942), Life magazine columnist
- Loudon Wainwright III (1965), songwriter, folk singer, humorist, and actor
- George Welch (1936), test pilot, medal of honor nominee
- William H. Whyte (1935), sociologist, author of The Organization Man
