= Owl's Nest Country Place =

Historic house in Delaware, United States

- U.S. National Register of Historic Places
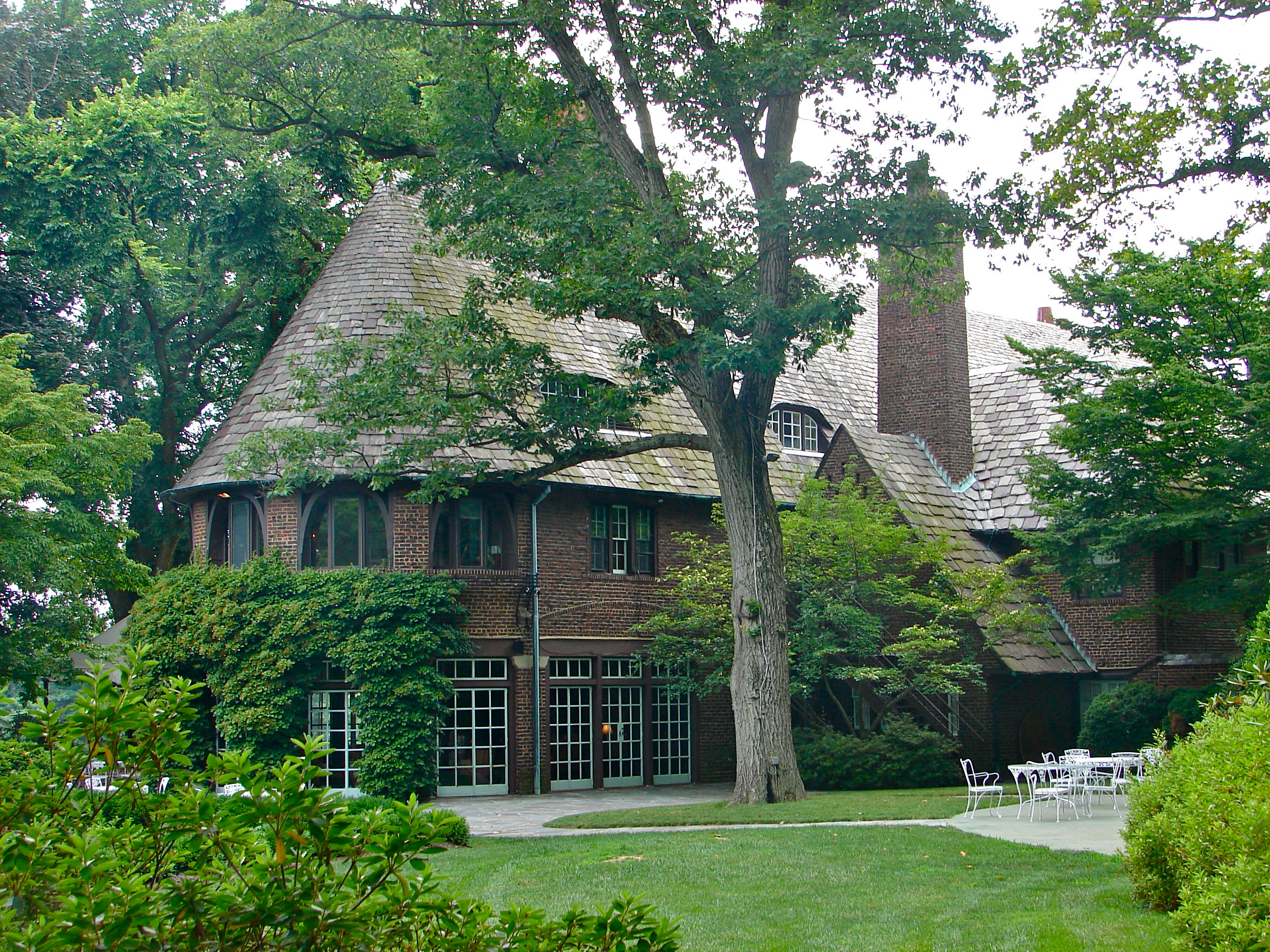

- Location within Delaware Location within the United States
- Location: 201 Owl's Nest Road, Greenville, Delaware
- Coordinates: 39.81539°N 75.62353°W
- Area: 418 acres (169 ha)
- Built: 1915
- Architect: Harrie T. Lindeberg
- Architectural style: Tudor Revival
- NRHP reference No.: 10000597
- Added to NRHP: August 30, 2010

The Greenville Country Club, formerly known as the Owl's Nest Country Place, is a country club at 201 Owl's Nest Road in Greenville, Delaware. The 18-acre (7.3 ha) property was developed in 1915 by Eugene du Pont, Jr., son of Eugene du Pont, as a country estate. It was one of the first major estates to be built by members of the Du Pont family in northern Delaware. The main house and three outbuildings were designed by Harrie T. Lindeberg in the Tudor Revival style, and were built in 1915. The estate's grounds were landscaped by Franklin Meehan and William Warner Parker. In 1928 an Ellen Shipman-designed boxwood garden was added to the grounds. The estate has been home to the Greenville Country Club since 1961.

The property was listed on the National Register of Historic Places in 2010.

== See also ==
- National Register of Historic Places listings in northern New Castle County, Delaware
