= Franklin D. Roosevelt III =

American economist and academic (born 1938)

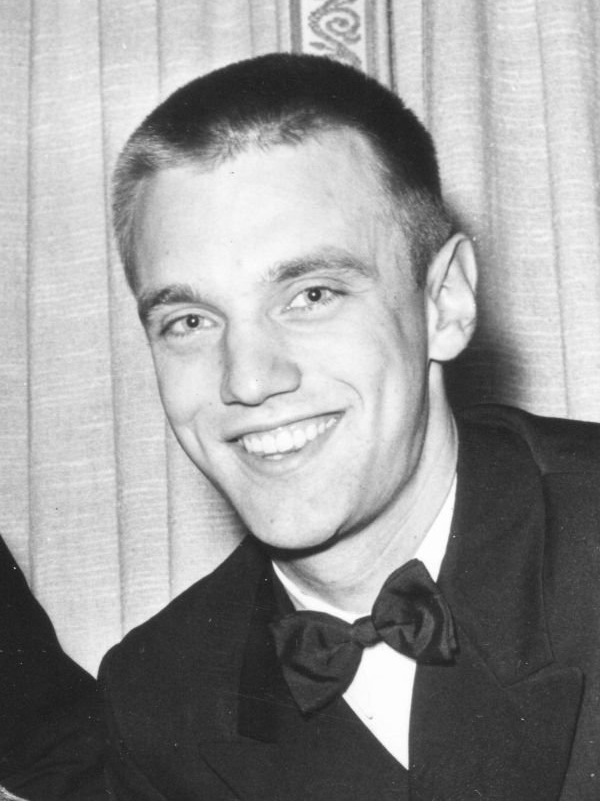
- Roosevelt in 1961
- Born: Franklin Delano Roosevelt III; July 19, 1938 (age 88); Philadelphia, Pennsylvania, U.S.
- Education: Yale University (BA); Columbia University (MA); The New School (PhD)
- Occupations: Economist, academic
- Political party: Democratic
- Spouse: Grace Rumsey Goodyear (m. 1962)
- Children: 3
- Parent(s): Franklin D. Roosevelt Jr. Ethel du Pont
- Relatives: See Roosevelt and du Pont

Signature
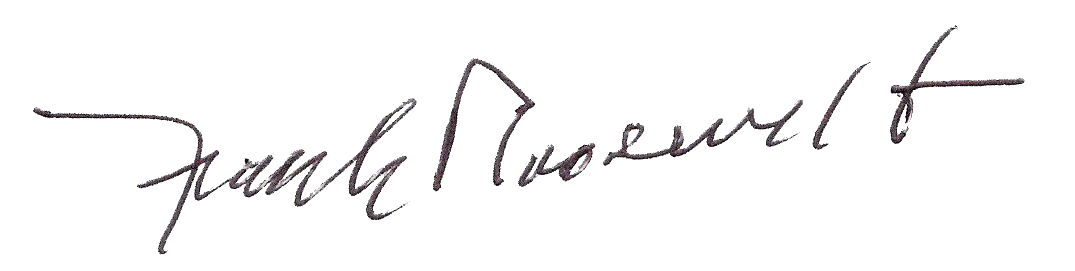

Franklin Delano Roosevelt III (born July 19, 1938) is an American retired economist and academic. Through his father, he is a grandson of 32nd U.S. president Franklin D. Roosevelt and Eleanor Roosevelt, and through his mother, he is related to the prominent du Pont family.

== Family ==
Franklin Delano Roosevelt III was the first child born to Franklin D. Roosevelt Jr. and his first wife, Ethel du Pont. He was born during his paternal grandfather Franklin D. Roosevelt's second term as president and was his eighth grandchild to be born. After his birth, his father said, "'Battling' Frank III is a beautiful baby."

He has a younger full brother, Christopher du Pont Roosevelt, who was born 1941. From their father's later marriages, the brothers have two younger half-sisters, Nancy Suzanne Roosevelt (born 1952) and Laura Delano Roosevelt (born 1959), and a younger half-brother, John Alexander Roosevelt (born 1977). They also had a younger half-brother, Benjamin S. Warren III (born 1954), from their mother's later marriage to attorney Benjamin S. Warren Jr.

== Education and career ==
After graduating from St. Mark's School in Southborough, Massachusetts, Frank Roosevelt received his Bachelor of Arts in Economics from Yale University in 1961. He was a midshipman in Yale Naval ROTC and commissioned as an Ensign to serve as on a minesweeper. He then received a master's degree from Columbia University in 1968, and his Ph.D. from The New School.

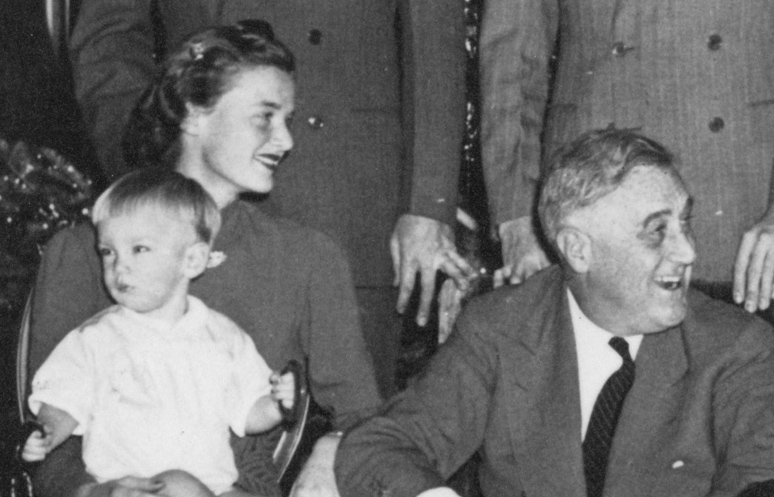
Frank Roosevelt with his mother, Ethel du Pont, and his grandfather, Franklin D. Roosevelt, at the White House, Christmas 1941

His dissertation was entitled Towards a Marxist Critique of the Cambridge School. His work primarily focused on combining Marxism and capitalism in an attempt to make modern economic systems more "fair" and less prone to the "winner takes all" scenario..

In 1977, he became a professor at Sarah Lawrence College in Yonkers, New York, where he was chair of the social sciences faculty from 1988 to 1990 and from 1991 to 1993. In retirement, he continued to speak about his grandparents' legacies.

He refers to himself as a "radical" or "alternative" economist.

Rhona Free, one of his former students who is a professor of economics at Eastern Connecticut State University, was named in 2004 one of four U.S. Professors of the Year by the Carnegie Foundation for the Advancement of Teaching and the Council for Advancement and Support of Education. In her acceptance speech, she cited Roosevelt as a significant influence, saying, "The most important teacher I ever had was Frank Roosevelt, an economics professor at Sarah Lawrence. He's much more interested in teaching than in testing and in encouraging than in evaluating. In his classes even an average student, as I was, can learn to think critically, express thoughts carefully, and view the world with an open mind."

In 2004, the university awarded him the Lipkin Family Prize for Inspirational Teaching.

Roosevelt was active in the civil rights movement. During the Student Nonviolent Coordinating Committee's Freedom Summer program in Mississippi in 1964, he was arbitrarily arrested by the Mississippi Highway Patrol while driving the civil rights lobbyist Allard K. Lowenstein across the state, but was immediately released when the police realized his identity.

== Politics and family legacy ==
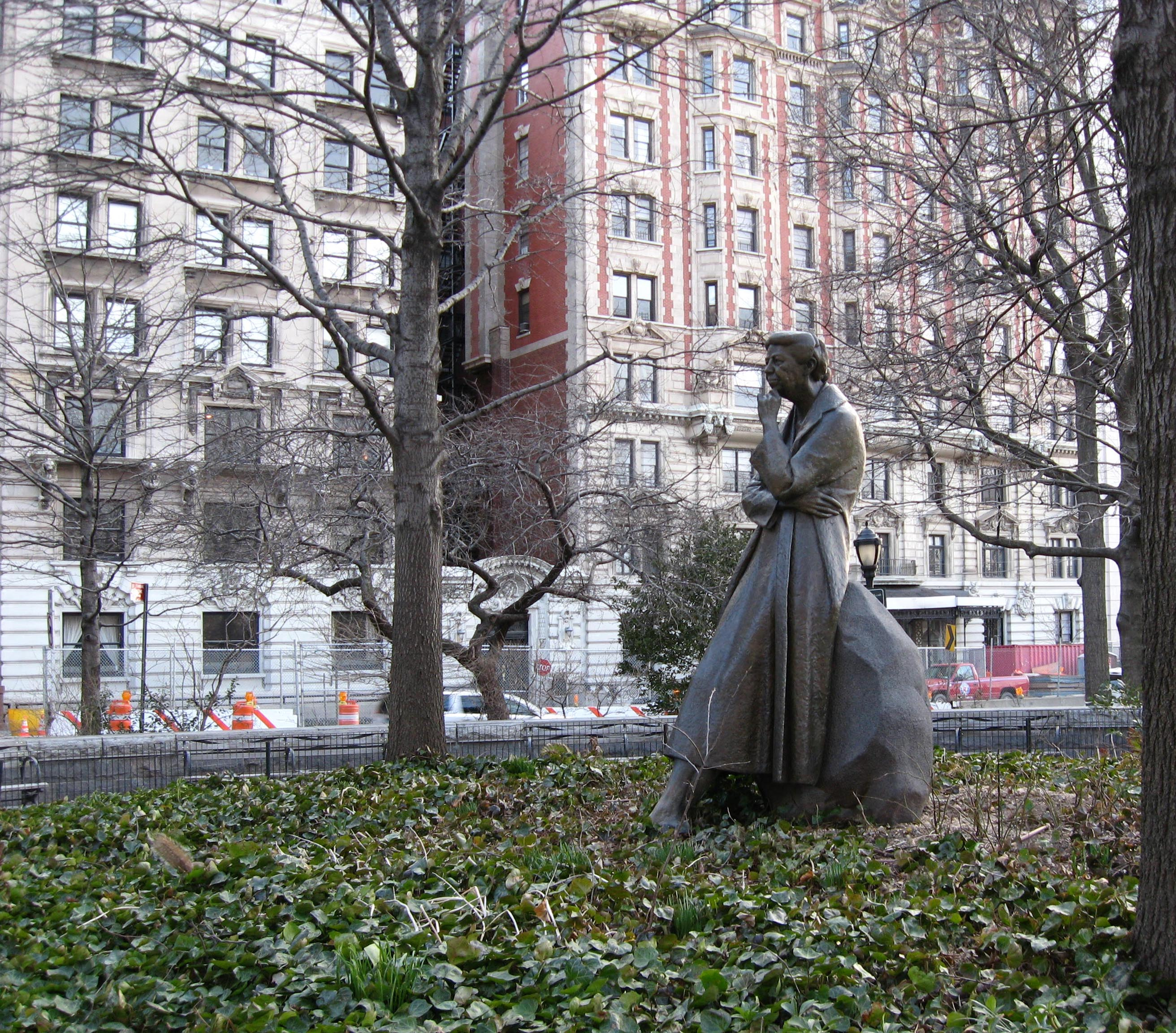
The Eleanor Roosevelt Monument in Manhattan

Roosevelt, who lives in Manhattan, was a member of the Board of Trustees of the Manhattan Country School from 1970 to 2010. In 1981, he led the effort to put the school's tuition system on a sliding scale.

Roosevelt led the effort to build a monument to his grandmother Eleanor Roosevelt at Riverside Park in Manhattan. The Eleanor Roosevelt Monument was unveiled in 1996.

Roosevelt has written in support of market socialism.

== Personal life ==
On June 18, 1962, Roosevelt was married to Grace Rumsey Goodyear, at St. Luke's Protestant Episcopal Church in Darien, Connecticut. At the time of their wedding, Grace was a graduate of Milton Academy and a student at Smith College. She is the daughter of Austin Goodyear (grandson of Charles W. Goodyear) and Louisa (née Robins) Goodyear (granddaughter of Thomas Robins Jr.) who lived at "White Oak Shade" in Darien. They have three children, including a set of twins:

- Phoebe Louisa Roosevelt (born February 25, 1965)
- Nicholas Martin Roosevelt (born June 8, 1966, twin)
- Amelia "Amie" Roosevelt (born June 8, 1966, twin), a concert violinist

== Published works ==
- Samuel Bowles; Richard Edwards; Frank Roosevelt (2005). Understanding Capitalism: Competition, Command, and Change (3rd ed.). Oxford University Press. ISBN 978-0-19-513865-8.
- Frank Roosevelt; David Belkin (1994). Why Market Socialism?: Voices from Dissent Paperback. M E Sharpe. ISBN 978-1-56324-466-7.
- Frank Roosevelt (1981). Tuition reform for private schools: The Manhattan Country School plan. ASIN B0006XWAY0.
