= China International Technology Transfer Center =

China International Technology Transfer Center (Chinese: 中国国际技术转移中心; pinyin: Zhōngguó guójì jìshù zhuǎnyí zhōngxīn) (CITTC) is a platform set up by the Ministry of Science and Technology of the People's Republic of China, the Beijing Municipal Commission of Science and Technology, and the Haidian District Government. It is devoted to promote and facilitate global technology transfer between universities, research centers, science parks, competitive clusters and public organizations, as well as Chinese industry.

== Functions and mission ==
China International Technology Transfer Center was established in 2011 by the Ministry of Science and Technology of the People's Republic of China, Beijing Municipal Commission of Science and Technology and Haidian District Government.

CITTC specializes in matchmaking events, training, seminars, conferences, incubation for start-ups, concrete project collaboration and others; it further provides business domiciliation, as well as assists with the facilitation of easy market access and partnering solutions with Chinese entities.

CITTC is the main organizer of China (Beijing) International Technology Transfer Convention (China ITTC), China's largest technology transfer forum.

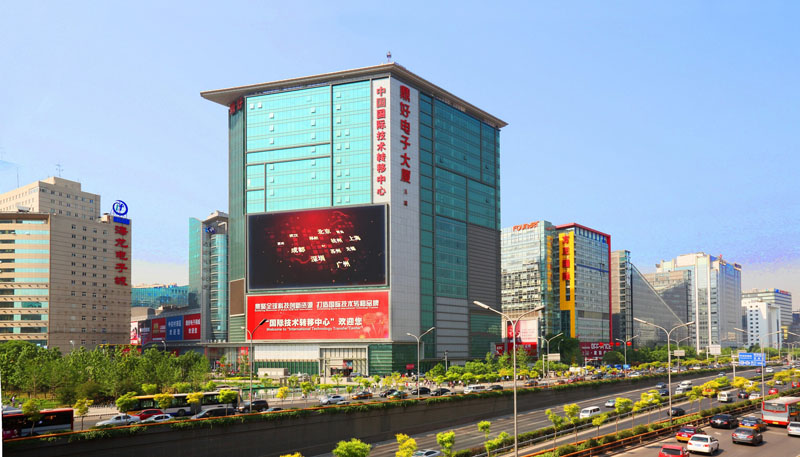
CITTC Beijing Headquarters

== Structure and organization ==
On a daily basis, the CITTC is managed by the Beijing Technology Exchange and Promotion Center (BTEC). It consists of several departments including legal, scientific and international relations.

== China International Technology Transfer Convention ==
CITTC is the main organizer of the China (Beijing) International Technology Transfer Convention (China ITTC), China's largest technology transfer forum and matchmaking event, which builds an important international platform for supporting Beijing's “World City” and “City of Innovation” effort and has facilitated the landing of a series of major international technology transfer projects in Beijing. CITTC has played a significant role in moving nationwide international technology transfer forward by attracting governmental agencies, hi-tech enterprises, research institutes and universities from nearly 20 provinces and regions throughout China. In 2014, more than 4,000 representatives from over 40 foreign countries and 20 provinces and cities of China were present at the conventions. Through the previous three events, over 500 cooperation intentions have been reached, and contracts of 60 projects worth over CNY 50 billion have been signed.

== See also ==
- Technology transfer
- State Administration of Foreign Experts Affairs
- Thousand Talents Plan
