= William H. Shaw =

American economist and businessman

William Howard Shaw (1909 – September 10, 1988) was an American economist, businessman and government official. He was an executive with E.I. Du Pont de Nemours and Co., an Assistant Secretary of Commerce, and president of the American Statistical Association.

== Biography ==
Shaw was born in Brooklyn in 1909. He received his bachelor's degree from Columbia University in 1930, M.A. in 1931, and Ph.D. in 1948.

Shaw began his career at the National Bureau of Economic Research. In 1940, he joined the United States Department of Commerce as an economic analyst. In 1951, he was appointed deputy director of the Office of Program Planning in the Department of Commerce. In 1953, he left to become a business economist with DuPont and was made manager of business economics in the Textile Fibers Department.

In 1966, he returned to the federal government as Assistant Secretary of Commerce for Economic Affairs, serving under Secretary John T. Connor. He held that position until 1968, when he returned to DuPont as assistant treasurer and retired in 1973.

In 1970, he was named by the Nixon administration as a member of the President's Commission on Federal Statistics to review the statistical programs of the federal government. He then served as a member of the Committee on National Statistics in the National Academy of Sciences from 1972 to 1976. In 1972, he was also named President of the American Statistical Association and served one full term.

Shaw was a member of the Cosmos Club and Kiwanis International.

He died of cancer on September 10, 1988 at age 79. He was living in Annapolis, Maryland.
