= Francis Irénée du Pont =

American chemist

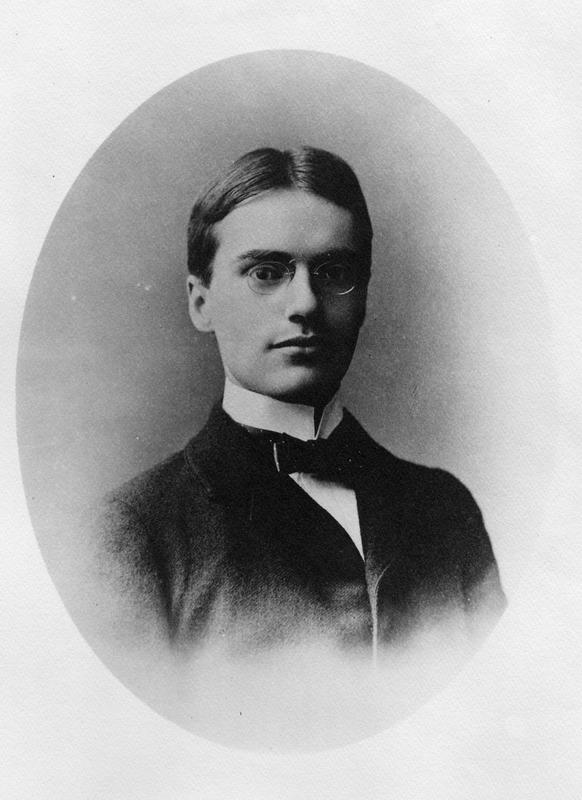
- Born: December 3, 1873; Greenville, Delaware, US
- Died: March 16, 1942 (aged 68)
- Education: University of Pennsylvania, Sheffield Scientific School
- Occupations: Chemist, businessman
- Father: Francis Gurney du Pont

Francis Irénée du Pont (December 3, 1873 – March 16, 1942) was an American chemist and executive at the E.I. du Pont de Nemours Company. He was the great grandson of its founder, Éleuthère Irénée du Pont.

== Biography ==
Francis I. du Pont was the eldest son of Francis Gurney du Pont and Elise Wigfall Simons. He was born and grew up at Hagley, near Greenville, Delaware, attended the University of Pennsylvania and graduated from Yale University’s Sheffield Scientific School in 1895. He was placed at his father's Carney's Point, New Jersey facility, where he joined in the research into the development of the new smokeless powder. This product was high sought after as the military was moving towards its use. He was known for his scientific expertise and managerial abilities, became superintendent of Carney's Point, and was the first head of DuPont’s new Experimental Station research facility in 1904.

When the company was reorganized following its purchase by the three cousins, Alfred I. du Pont, Pierre S. du Pont, and T. Coleman du Pont in 1903, Francis I. du Pont was named to the Board of Directors and Executive Committee. With T. Coleman du Pont as President the company continued to grow, but within a few years Pierre S. du Pont became the acting president and effective leader of the company. In 1914, with the outbreak of World War I and the declining health of T. Coleman du Pont, Pierre and Coleman sought a way to have the company buy Coleman's share of the company and redistribute it to some of the most highly valued non-family members in the company management. This effort, along with other more personal factors, touched off a full scale break between the cousins. Francis sided with Alfred I. du Pont in the contest, but by 1916 they had lost control and Francis lost his seat on the Board of Directors.

After leaving the company, he and his brother, Ernest du Pont, organized the U.S.F. Powder Company, which produced for the U.S. Navy a flashless powder for cannon. In 1922 he became Treasurer for the du Pont Motor Company and, with his son, Edmund du Pont, founded a Wall Street brokerage in 1931.

In 1913, he published, through Saylor Show Print, Wilmington, DE, "Taxation: A Treatise written by F. I. DuPont" developing the ideas of Henry George (1839–1897), the Philadelphia-born author of "Progress and Poverty," which remains the best-selling book ever on political economy. In his treatise, he examines various potential tax bases, and concludes that taxation of privilege, through taxation of land value, is the most desirable alternative. He calls land speculation "a gross misuse of the power of government" that ought to be abolished by taxation, in order to create prosperity. He ran unsuccessfully for Mayor of Wilmington on that platform on the Progressive ticket.

Du Pont was elected to the American Philosophical Society in 1942.

Francis I. du Pont died on March 16, 1942.
