= Yet2.com =

Consulting company and technology marketplace

yet2.com
- Industry: Open innovation, Technology sales & Venture capital
- Founded: 1999; 27 years ago
- Founder: Ben duPont, Chris De Bleser & Phil Stern
- Number of locations: Boston, Liverpool, Tokyo and Wilmington, Delaware
- Key people: Ben duPont, Phil Stern, Tim Bernstein
- Owner: Private
- Website: www.yet2.com

yet2.com is a global open innovation consulting company and technology marketplace founded in February 1999. The company is based around the idea of matching large companies with smaller companies, inventors, startups, and academic institutions, as well as allowing all types of technologies to be bought and sold on an online marketplace. Shortly after the company's founding in 1999, it became the largest global market for patents.

== History ==
yet2.com was founded in 1999 by Ben duPont and Chris De Bleser. DuPont was attempting to sell a new technology that he had developed. Chris De Bleser was in a similar situation at Polaroid. Originally intended to be an online marketplace only, yet2 changed strategies to provide more consulting services and offline project work. Since its founding the company has provided services to Fortune 500 and Global 2000 companies including Boeing, Ford, Monsanto and NTT among others.

Until 2016, yet2 also included yet2Ventures, a secondary investment firm run by DuPont and Phil Stern. Later that year, yet2Ventures became Chartline Capital Partners and effectively separated operations from yet2.com.

=== Funding ===
The company was founded with original investments from Venrock Capital, Procter & Gamble, DuPont, Honeywell, Caterpillar, NTT Leasing, Bayer and Siemens raising over $24 million.

== See also ==
- Technology Scouting
- Open Innovation
