= Lydia Chichester du Pont =

American philanthropist (1907–1958)

Lydia Chichester du Pont (1907–1958) was an American heir who was part of the prominent Du Pont family.

The daughter of Felix and Mary du Pont, Lydia du Pont was an amateur pilot and an adventurer who was part of a 1935 University of Pennsylvania scientific expedition to the jungles of Venezuela to study the culture of the Guajiros peoples. She was the President and a member of the Board of Governors of Children's Beach House, Inc. a charitable organization in Lewes, Delaware for underprivileged children with health issues.

Lydia du Pont was living at the family's Point Lookout Farm when she was killed in a car crash on June 24, 1958, while being driven by a cousin to Delaware Park Racetrack.
