= Homsey =

Homsey is a surname. Notable people with the name include:

- Victorine & Samuel Homsey (1900–1998) and (1904–1994), founders of an American architectural firm in Delaware
- George W. Homsey (1926–2019), American architect based in the San Francisco, California Bay Area
- Victorine du Pont Homsey (1900–1998), American architect and member of the du Pont family

== See also ==
- Esherick, Homsey, Dodge, and Davis US–based architecture firm
