= List of Valparaiso University alumni =

Valparaiso University is a Lutheran college located in Valparaiso, Indiana. Following is a list of Valparaiso University alumni.

== Academia ==
- R. J. Q. Adams (born 1943; M.A. 1969), professor of European and British history at Texas A&M University
- Patrick Roger Cleary, founder of Cleary University
- Major E. Holmes, dean of the New York State College of Ceramics at Alfred University and founder and head of the Department of Ceramic Engineering at the Missouri School of Mine
- William P. Richardson (1864–1945), co-founder and first dean of Brooklyn Law School
- Henry P. Rusk (1884–1954), dean of the department of agriculture at the University of Illinois
- Thomas F. Schutte (1935–2025; B.A. degree 1957), president of Pratt Institute (1993–2017) and Rhode Island School of Design (1983–1992)
- James Monroe Smith, president of Louisiana State University (1930–1939)
- David J. Zersen, (born 1938, B.A. 1960), dean at Concordia University Wisconsin (1990–1996) and president at Concordia University Texas (1996–2002).

== Business ==
- Jay Christopher, co-founder of Pampered Chef
- Don Fites, chairman and CEO (retired) of Caterpillar Inc.
- Kathi Seifert, executive vice president of Kimberly-Clark 1991–2004
- Lowell Yerex, founder of Transportes Aéreos Centro Americanos (TACA), British West Indian Airways in Trinidad and Tobago, and Aerovias Brasil in Rio de Janeiro

== Entertainment ==
- Adam Amin, Fox Sports and CHSN play-by-play broadcaster
- Beulah Bondi, actress
- Alys McKey Bryant, record-setting aviation pioneer and exhibition pilot
- JoBe Cerny, character actor and voice of the Pillsbury Doughboy
- Paul Chambers, CNN anchor and film critic
- Andre "Add-2" Daniels, rapper
- Michael Essany, television talk show host
- Brandon LaChappelle, social media influencer and technology content creator
- John Lutz, actor known for 30 Rock and writer for Saturday Night Live
- Jacki Lyden, senior correspondent at NPR
- David Ruprecht, host of Supermarket Sweep and Real People
- Judith Sherman, multi-Grammy Award-winning record producer
- Ginger Zee, meteorologist for Good Morning America and ABC News

== Law ==
- David W. Dugan, United States Federal District Court judge in the Southern District of Illinois
- Omer Stokes Jackson, 28th Indiana attorney general
- Keith Kizer, Nevada chief deputy attorney general and former executive director of the Nevada State Athletic Commission
- Moses Lairy, justice of the Indiana Supreme Court
- Rebecca R. Pallmeyer, United States federal judge
- Eugene E. Parker, sports attorney and agent of Larry Fitzgerald, Deion Sanders, Hines Ward, Greg Jennings, Ndamukong Suh, and Michael Crabtree
- Shelice Tolbert, attorney in Indiana

== Literature and journalism ==
- Fredrick Barton, novelist and film critic
- Anthony Bimba (1894–1982), newspaper editor, historian, and radical political activist
- Barbara Ann Kipfer, linguist, lexicographer, author, and editor
- Idael Makeever, poet
- William March, novelist, known for Company K and The Bad Seed
- René Steinke, novelist known for The Fires and Holy Skirts
- Lowell Thomas, author, war correspondent during World War I who made T. E. Lawrence internationally famous, and recipient of the Presidential Medal of Freedom

== Politics ==
- Roy E. Ayers, U.S. representative and 11th governor of Montana
- Frederick M. Bernthal, assistant secretary of state for Oceans and International Environmental and Scientific Affairs (1988–1990)
- Mikhail Borodin, Soviet and Comintern representative to China
- LeRoy Earl Brophey Sr., Minnesota House of Representatives
- John E. Cashman, Wisconsin senator
- Stoyan Christowe, Vermont Senate (1959–1972)
- Thurman C. Crook, United States representative from Indiana
- Marcellus Dorwin, Wisconsin State Assembly
- Edward Grassman, Wisconsin State Assembly
- Margaret Keenan Harrais, United States commissioner at Valdez, Alaska and deputy magistrate
- Walter Hunt, Wisconsin Senate
- Samuel B. Huston, Oregon Legislative Assembly
- Andrieus A. Jones, United States Senate, supported New Mexico statehood
- Edgar E. Lien, Wisconsin State Assembly
- James F. McDowell, Wisconsin State Assembly
- H. Lane Mitchell (Engineering), public works commissioner in Shreveport, Louisiana (1934–1968)
- George William Norris, United States senator from Nebraska; "father" of the Tennessee Valley Authority
- William Edmunds Plummer, Wisconsin State Assembly
- Caleb Powers, U.S. representative from Kentucky; secretary of state of Kentucky; convicted as an accessory to murder of the state governor
- Benjamin Shively, United States senator from Indiana (1909–1916)
- Len Small, 26th governor of Illinois
- Donald Edgar Tewes, U.S. representative from Wisconsin
- Jill Long Thompson, U.S. representative from Indiana 1989–1995 and under secretary of agriculture for Rural Development 1995–2001
- Otis Wingo, U.S. representative from Arkansas's 4th congressional district (1913–1930)

== Science and medicine ==
- Edward Thomas Abrams, doctor and legislator
- Blanche Evans Dean, naturalist, conservationist, and author
- Christine Essenberg (1876–1965), marine zoologist and women's education advocate
- Reuben Kahn, immunologist and inventor of a test for syphilis
- Carl Glennis Roberts (1886–1950), surgeon, gynecologist, and civil rights activist

== Sports ==
- Ryan Broekhoff, former NBA player
- Bryce Drew, college basketball coach and former NBA player
- Scott Drew, college basketball coach and NCAA National Champion
- Keith Kizer, former executive director of the Nevada State Athletic Commission and Nevada chief deputy attorney general
- Cal Luther, college basketball coach
- Lloyd McClendon, Major League Baseball player and manager
- Jon Steinbrecher, commissioner of the Mid America Conference
- Frederick "Fuzzy" Thurston, professional football player with the Green Bay Packers (1959–67)
- Jim Wacker, former football coach at the University of Minnesota
- Austin Walton, NBA agent and owner of Walton Sports Management Group
