= Charles F. Bloszies =

American architect and structural engineer

- Born: January 29, 1949 (age 77); Omaha, Nebraska, U.S.
- Education: University of Colorado Boulder; University of Pennsylvania
- Occupations: Architect, structural engineer, educator, author
- Known for: Adaptive reuse and urban infill architecture
- Website: Office of Charles F. Bloszies

Charles F. Bloszies FAIA, SE, LEED AP (born January 29, 1949) is an American architect, structural engineer, educator, and author based in San Francisco, California. He is noted for his work in adaptive reuse, urban infill, and modular design addressing homelessness.

== Early life and education ==
Bloszies was born in Omaha, Nebraska, and moved with his family to Denver, Colorado, in 1964. He earned a B.A. in philosophy from the University of Colorado Boulder and master’s degrees in architecture (M.Arch) and Civil and Urban Engineering (M.S.) from the University of Pennsylvania.

== Career ==
After early work with Keast & Hood Structural Engineers and the architectural firm Esherick Homsey Dodge and Davis (EHDD), Bloszies established the Office of Charles F. Bloszies, FAIA in 1985. He has taught architecture at the University of Pennsylvania, the University of California, San Diego, and the California College of the Arts. He is the author of Old Buildings, New Designs: Architectural Transformations published in 2011 by Princeton Architectural Press. His writings on architecture and urbanism have appeared in Architectural Record, ArcCA Digest, and ArchNewsNow.

== Notable projects ==
Works by Bloszies include:

- 690 Market Street (Ritz-Carlton Club and Residences) – renovation of the historic Chronicle Building.
- One Kearny – a downtown San Francisco tower praised by critic John King as “serious architecture.”
- San Mateo County Navigation Center – a 240-unit modular interim supportive housing project, highlighted in Architectural Record, the San Mateo Daily Journal and The New York Times.
- Cathedral School for Boys – a campus renovation and terrace addition.
- Blu Dot San Francisco – a retail adaptive-reuse project.

== Recognition ==
In 2014 Bloszies was elected a Fellow of the American Institute of Architects (FAIA). His firm’s work has received national and regional honors, including:

- 2010 – Kirby Ward Fitzpatrick Prize, Architectural Foundation of San Francisco
- 2014 – AIA San Francisco Excellence in Architecture Citation
- 2022 – ULI Americas Award of Excellence (Homekey LifeMoves, Mountain View)
- 2023 – Engineering News-Record Award of Merit: Government/Public Building
- 2023 – Silicon Valley Business Journal Community Impact Award for the San Mateo Navigation Center
- 2024 – Fast Company World Changing Ideas Award (Architecture Category)
