= Trillium grandiflorum 'Pamela Copeland' =

Flowering plant cultivar

Trillium grandiflorum
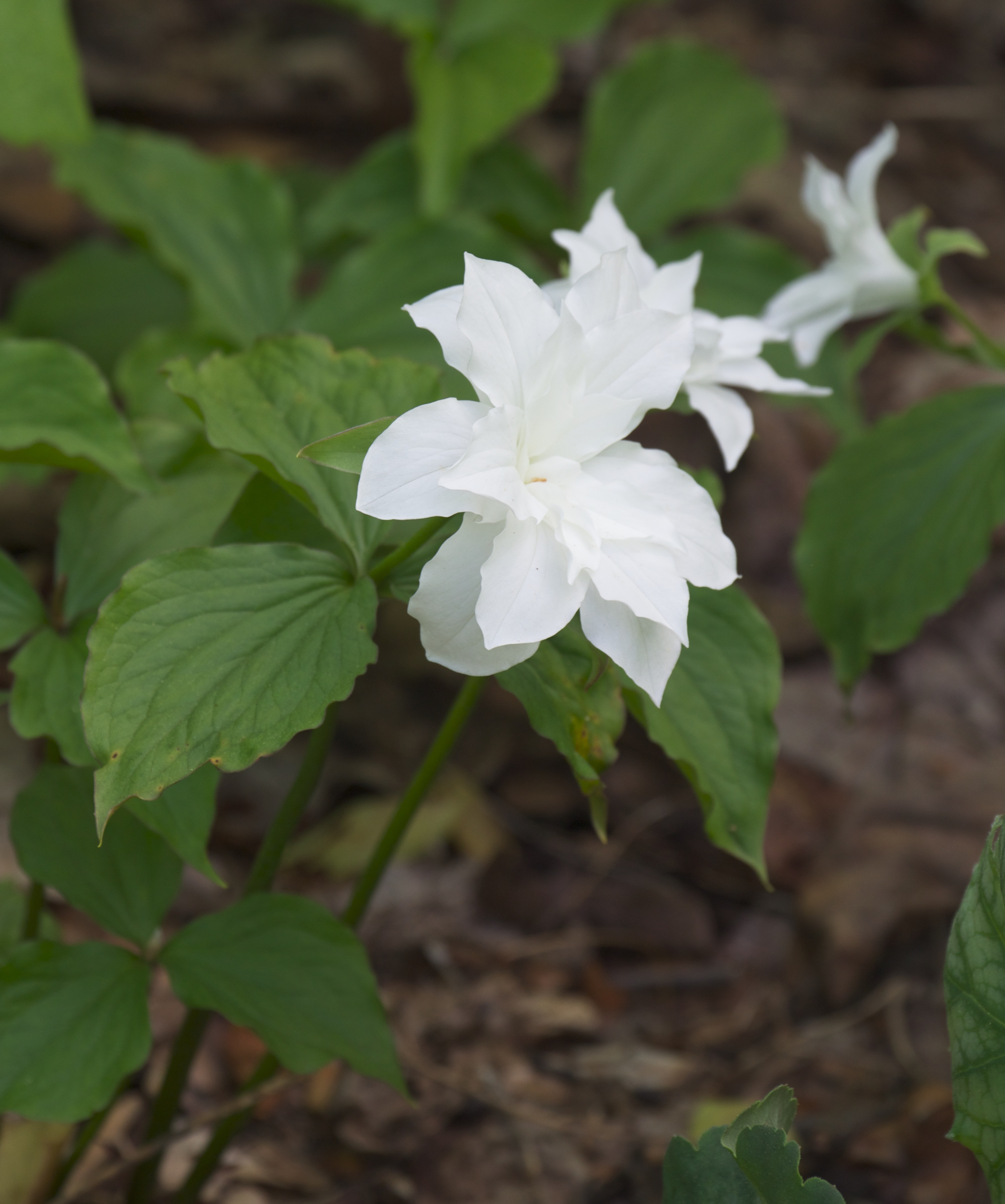
- Cultivar: 'Pamela Copeland'
- Origin: Delaware, United States

Trillium grandiflorum 'Pamela Copeland' is a cultivated double form of the large-flowered trillium, Trillium grandiflorum.

In 1996, it was selected and named by Roberta and Frederick W. Case, Jr. as a tribute to Mt. Cuba Center’s founder, Pamela Cunningham Copeland. Peak flowering occurs in mid-May, slightly later than the single-flowered forms in the garden and provides a longer show because of its numerous petals. This large-flowered trillium requires a filtered or partial shady spot with neutral and moist soil that is rich in organic matter. In acidic soil, a dusting of limestone (dolomite) in fall is beneficial every 2 years. Foliage emerges and stays green through summer and fall, as do its seeds and fruits. This showy beauty combines well in naturalistic gardens with other woodland favorites such as Phlox divaricata, Cypripedium parviflorum var. pubescens, Tiarella (foam flower) and Iris cristata. Mrs. Copeland had an abiding interest in trilliums and made sure her shaded garden was full of these spring beauties.
