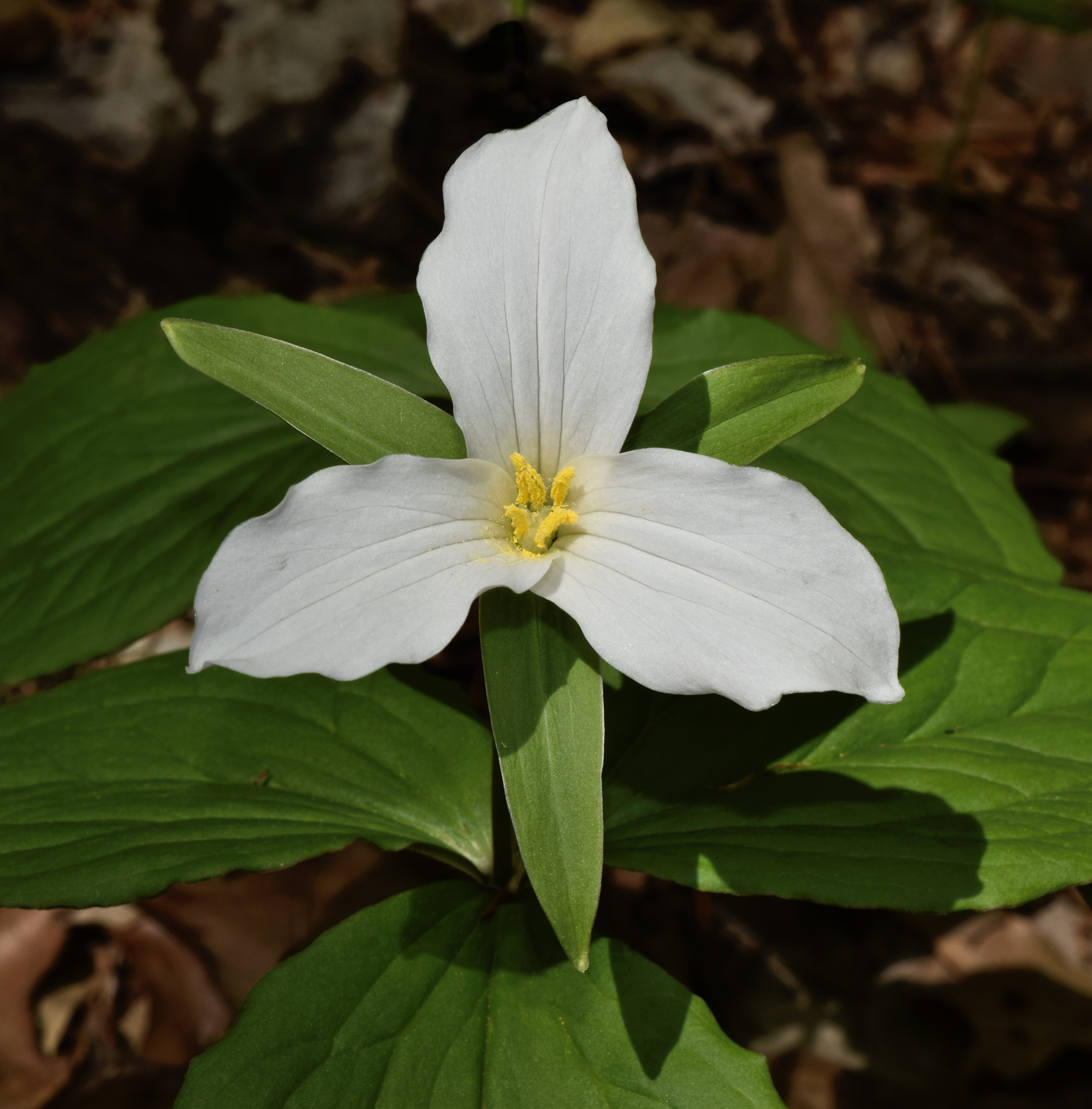
- White trillium blooming in Backus Woods (Ontario, Canada).

Conservation status
- Secure (NatureServe)

Scientific classification
- Kingdom: Plantae
- Clade: Tracheophytes
- Clade: Angiosperms
- Clade: Monocots
- Order: Liliales
- Family: Melanthiaceae
- Genus: Trillium
- Species: T. grandiflorum

Binomial name
- Trillium grandiflorum (Michx.) Salisb.

Synonyms
- Trillium grandiflorum: Trillium chandleri Farw.; Trillium chandleri f. foliaceum Farw.; Trillium chandleri f. gladewitzii Farw.; Trillium chandleri f. palaceum Farw.; Trillium chandleri f. plenum Farw.; Trillium chandleri f. subulatum Farw.; Trillium erythrocarpum Curtis; Trillium grandiflorum f. chandleri (Farw.) Vict.; Trillium grandiflorum f. lirioides (Raf.) Vict.; Trillium grandiflorum var. minimum N.Coleman; Trillium lirioides Raf.; Trillium lirioides f. albomarginatum Farw.; Trillium lirioides f. giganteum Farw.; Trillium lirioides var. longipetiolatum Farw.; Trillium lirioides f. subsessile Farw.; Trillium lirioides f. ungulatum Farw.; Trillium lirioides f. variegatum Farw.; Trillium liroides f. vegetum Farw.; Trillium obcordatum Raf.; Trillium rhomboideum var. grandiflorum Michx.

= Trillium grandiflorum =

Species of flowering plant

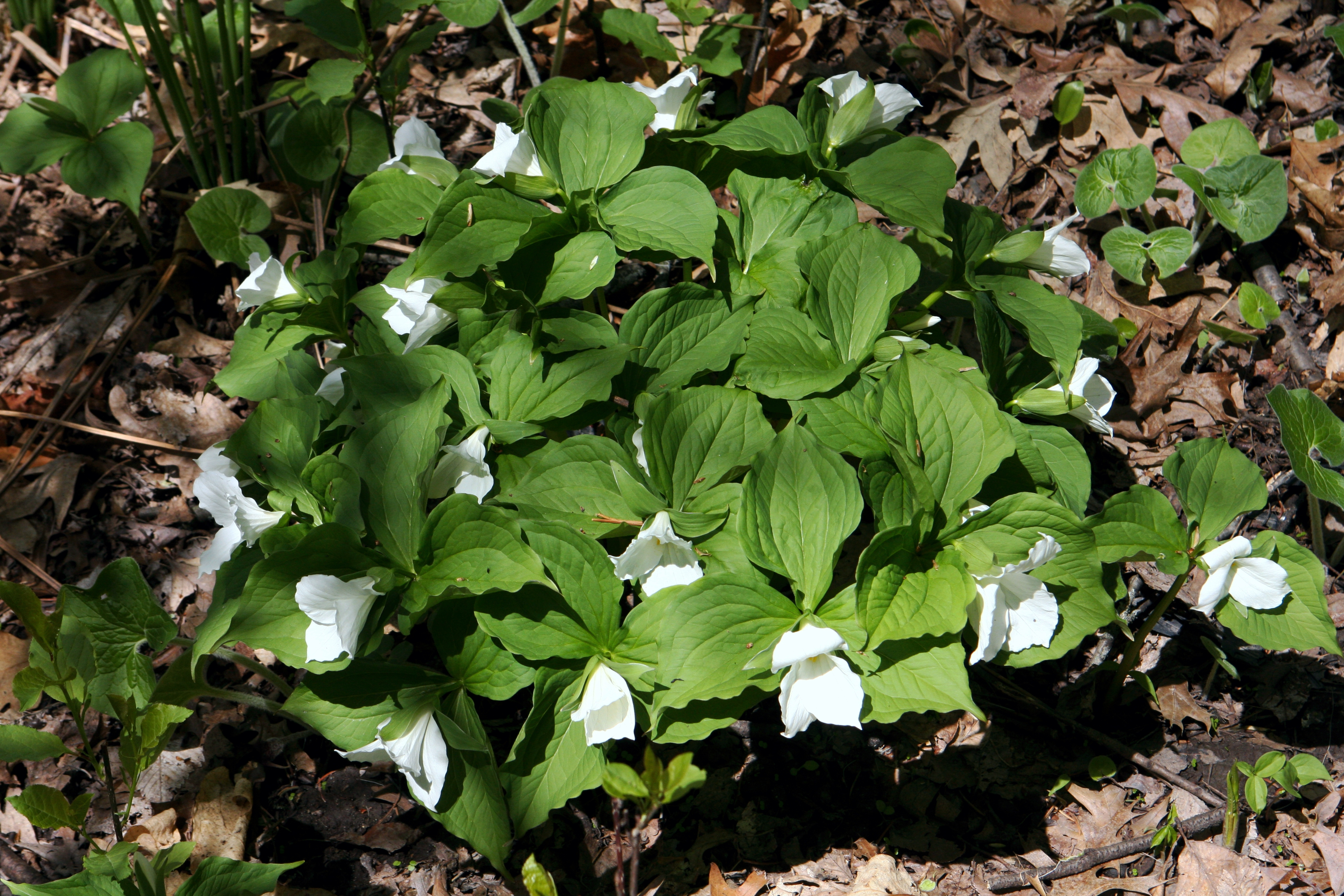
Trillium grandiflorum clonal colony

Trillium grandiflorum, the white trillium, large-flowered trillium, great white trillium, white wake-robin or in French: trille blanc, is a species of flowering plant in the family Melanthiaceae. A monocotyledonous, herbaceous perennial, the plant is native to eastern North America, from northern Quebec to the southern parts of the United States through the Appalachian Mountains into northernmost Georgia and west to Minnesota. There are also several isolated populations in Nova Scotia, Maine, southern Illinois, and Iowa.

Trillium grandiflorum is most common in rich, mixed upland forests. It is easily recognized by its attractive three-petalled white flowers, opening from late spring to early summer, that rise above a whorl of three leaf-like bracts. It is an example of a spring ephemeral, a plant whose life-cycle is synchronized with that of the deciduous woodland which it favours.

White trillium often occurs in dense drifts of many individuals. The G. Richard Thompson Wildlife Management Area in the Blue Ridge Mountains is renowned for an extensive stand of white trillium that blooms each spring. Over a two square mile area along the Appalachian Trail near Linden, Virginia there is a spectacular annual display of white trilliums estimated at near ten million individuals.

== Description ==
Trillium grandiflorum is a perennial that grows from a short rhizome and produces a single, showy white flower atop a whorl of three leaves. Flowering stems are 20–40 cm (8–16 in) tall. The leaves are often called bracts as the "stem" is then considered a peduncle (the rhizome is the stem proper, aboveground shoots of a rhizome are branches or peduncles); the distinction between bracts (found on pedicels or peduncles) and leaves (borne on stems). A single rootstock will often form clonal colonies, which can become very large and dense.

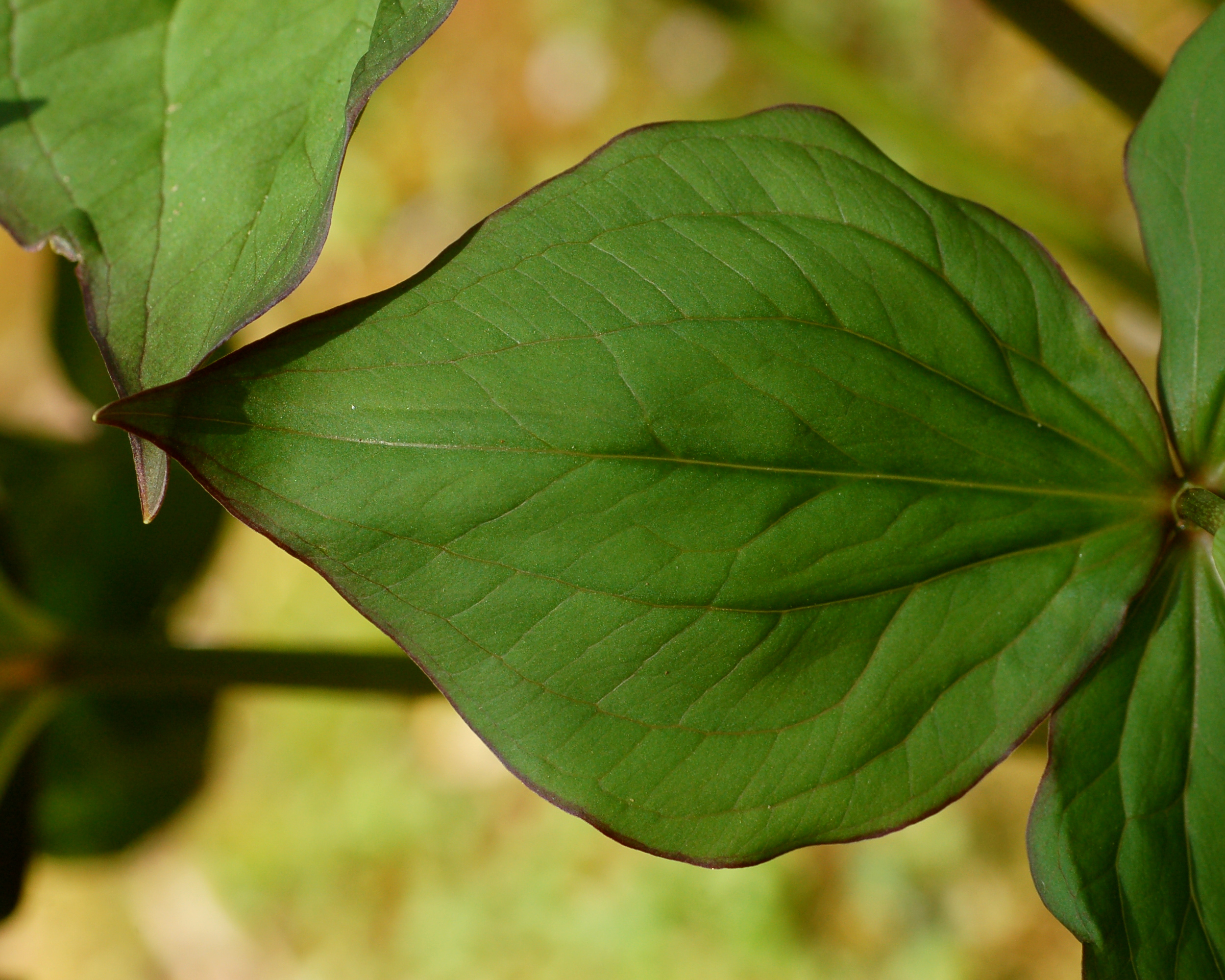
Detail of a leafy bract showing engraved venation

The erect, odorless flowers are large, especially compared to other species of Trillium, with 4 to 7 cm (1.5 to 3 in) long petals, depending on age and vigor. The petals are shaped much like the leaves and curve outward. They have a visible venation, though this is not as heavily marked as on the leaves. Their overlapping bases and curve give the flowers a distinctive funnel shape. Between the veined petals, three acuminate (ending with a long point) sepals are visible; they are usually a paler shade of green than the leaves, and are sometimes streaked with maroon. The flowers are perched on a pedicel (i.e., flower stalk) raising them above the leaf whorl, and grow pinker as they age. The flowers' stigmas are slender, straight or mostly so, narrowing at the end. The white petals are much longer than the green sepals. The flowers have six stamens in two whorls of three, which persist after fruiting. The styles are white and very short compared to the 9–27 mm (0.35–1.06 in) anthers, which are pale yellow, but become a brighter shade when liberating pollen due to the latter's color. The ovaries are six-sided with three greenish-white stigmas that are at first weakly attached, but fuse higher up. The fruit is a green, mealy and moist orb, and is vaguely six-sided like the ovary.

== Taxonomy ==
Trillium grandiflorum was first described by André Michaux in 1803 as variety grandiflorum of Trillium rhomboideum, a species now regarded as a synonym of Trillium erectum var. erectum. Michaux described the variety as having broadly rhombic leaves, large white petals, and black fruit. The epithet grandiflorum means "large-flowered", a name that well describes Michaux's variety. In 1805, Richard Anthony Salisbury elevated the variety to a full species. As a consequence, and partially by accident, Trillium grandiflorum is commonly known as the large-flowered white trillium.

As of March 2023, the name Trillium grandiflorum (Michx.) Salisb. is widely recognized. The species is a member of the Grandiflorum group, a group of species typified by Trillium grandiflorum itself. The group, which also includes Trillium nivale and Trillium ovatum, is sister to a clade comprising subgenus Sessilia (the sessile-flowered trilliums) and subgenus Delostylis (the Catesbaei group).

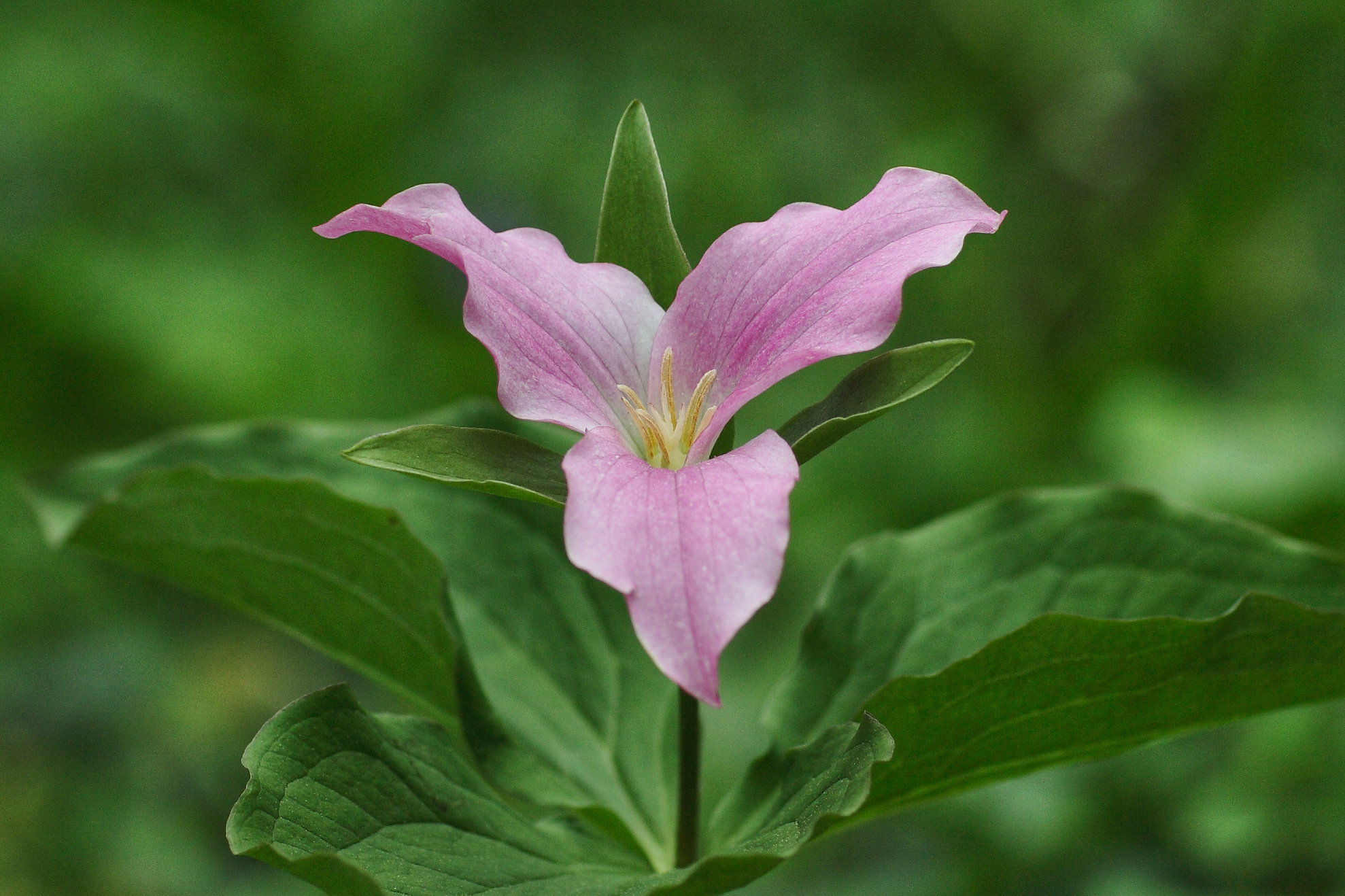
Trillium grandiflorum forma roseum with distinctly undulate margin of petals and leaves

As of November 2021, Plants of the World Online (POWO) lists 20 synonyms for Trillium grandiflorum. Although POWO accepts no infraspecific names, numerous varieties and forms have been described. Of these, perhaps the best known is Trillium grandiflorum f. roseum Farw., which was described by Oliver Atkins Farwell in 1920. The flower of forma roseum opens a striking salmon-pink instead of the more typical white. The pink color of the form is warmer and more attractive than the pink induced by aging. It occurs rarely throughout the range of the species, except along the Blue Ridge Mountains of Virginia where it is locally frequent. The epithet roseum means "rose-like, rose-colored", and so the form is sometimes called the rose trillium.

Trillium grandiflorum, unlike most trilliums, occasionally produces double-flowered forms with more than three petals. T. grandiflorum f. polymerum Vict., a multipetaled form described by Marie-Victorin Kirouac in 1929, occurs rather frequently in this species. Although these wild forms are stable and healthy, the plants usually lack normal floral organs and are therefore completely sterile. The epithet polymerum means "many-parts", which in this case refers to the many flower petals of the form.

Some variants of Trillium grandiflorum have abnormal green markings on the petals (floral virescence), floral organs that take on a leaf-like appearance (phyllody), or other abnormal characteristics. Many of these forms have been given taxonomic names with epithets such as albomarginatum ("white-margined", referring to the petals), foliaceum, ("leaf-like, leafy"), giganteum ("unusually large or tall"), and longipetiolatum ("with long petioles"). A typical example is the variety Trillium grandiflorum var. variegatum E.F.Sm., described by Erwin Frink Smith in 1879. The epithet variegatum ("streaked or spotted with color") refers to its virescent petals, a distinguishing characteristic of this variety. In 1971, it was shown that mycoplasma-like organisms (now called phytoplasmas) were present in all such forms examined (but not in normal plants). The authors concluded that "such plants should now be regarded as diseased T. grandiflorum and the varietal designation of Smith should be considered invalid."

Unlike other species such as Trillium erectum, which hybridize fairly easily, Trillium grandiflorum is not known to form hybrids.

== Ecology ==
Trillium grandiflorum favors well-drained, neutral to slightly acid soils, usually in second- or young-growth forests. In the Northern parts of its range it shows an affinity for maple or beech forests, but has also been known to spread into nearby open areas. Depending on geographical factors, it flowers from late April to early June, just after Trillium erectum. Like many forest perennials, Trillium grandiflorum is a slow growing plant. Its seeds have double dormancy, meaning they normally take at least two years to fully germinate. The seeds are dispersed in late summer, germinating after a cold and then a warm period, producing a root and after another winter the seedling's cotyledon emerges from the soil. Like most species of Trillium, flowering age is determined largely by the surface of the leaf and size of the rhizome instead of age alone. Because growth is very slow in nature, T. grandiflorum typically requires seven to ten years in optimal conditions to reach flowering size, which corresponds to a minimum of 36 cm^{2} (5.6 sq in) of leaf surface area and 2.5 cm^{3} (0.15 cu in) of rhizome volume. In cultivation, however, wide disparity of flowering ages are observed.

=== Pollination and seed dispersal ===
Trillium grandiflorum has long been thought to self-pollinate based on the fact that pollinators had rarely been observed visiting the plants and because there is low variation in chromosomal banding patterns. This has been strongly challenged, as other studies have shown high pollination rates by bumblebees and very low success of self-pollination in controlled experiments, implying that they are in fact self-incompatible. Several ovules of a given individual often fail to produce seeds. One contributing factor is pollen limitation, and one study showed that open pollinated plants had 56% of their ovules produce seeds, while in hand pollinated individuals the figure was 66%. Plants with reduced exposure to pollinators were 33% to 50% less likely to produce fruits than those that were, while hand pollinated individuals showed a 100% fruit set (though these fruits did not contain a 100% seed set). Plant resources were shown to be a limiting factor in seed production: when pollen was in abundance, larger plants had a significantly greater seed to ovule ratio than smaller ones. The overall suboptimal seed to ovule ratios suggest that Trillium grandiflorum has evolved to maximize reproductive success in the face of highly stochastic pollination, where some plants may only be visited by a single pollinator in a season.

Trillium grandiflorum has been studied extensively by ecologists due to a number of unique features it possesses. It is a representative example of a plant whose seeds are spread through myrmecochory, or ant-mediated dispersal, which is effective in increasing the plant's ability to outcross, but ineffective in bringing the plant very far. This has led ecologists to question how it and similar plants were able to survive glaciation events during the ice ages. The height of the species has also been shown to be an effective index of how intense foraging by deer is in a particular area.

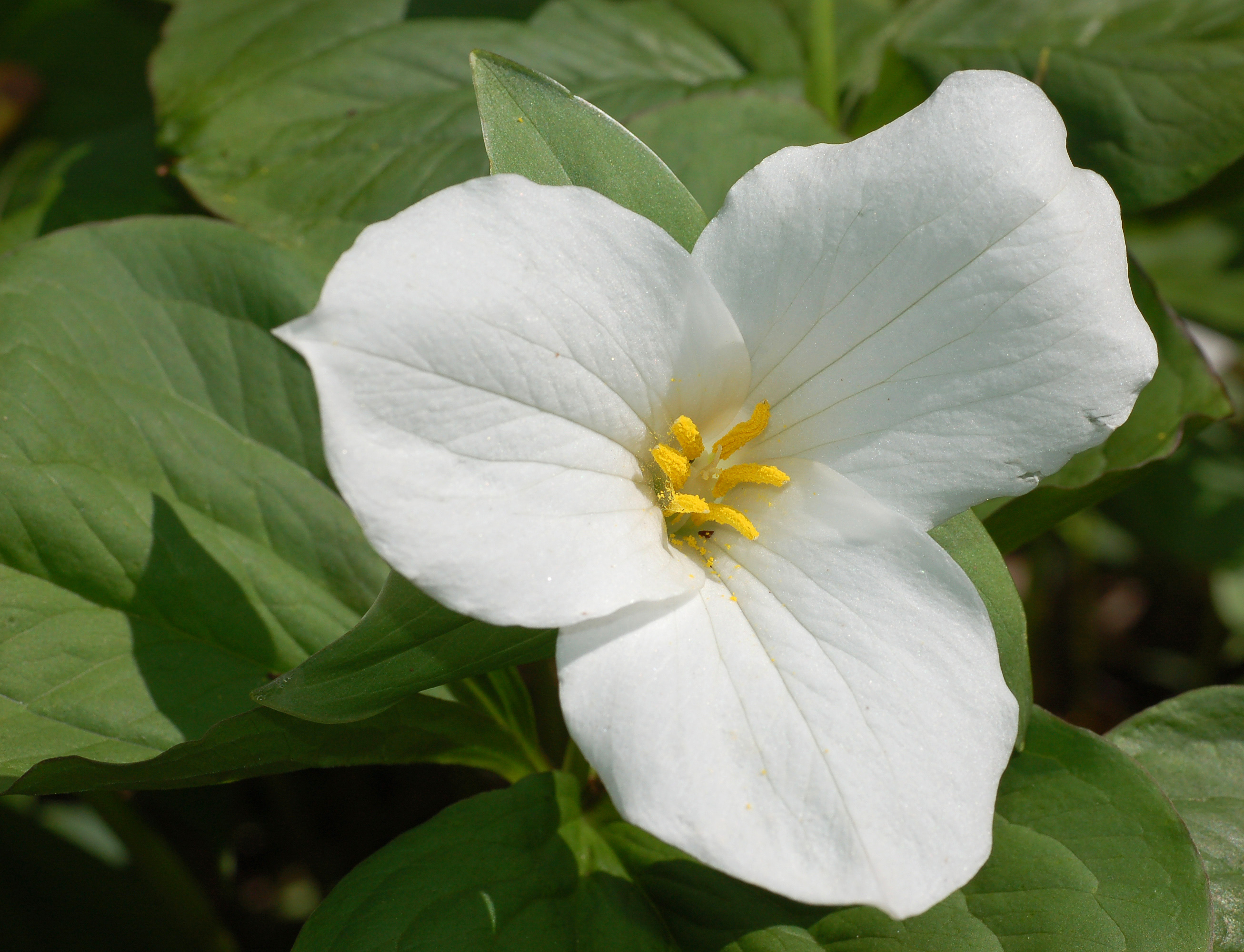
Detail of flower showing 6 stamens, 3 stigmas, and petals with deep veins

Fruits are released in the summer, containing about 16 seeds on average. These seeds are most typically dispersed by ants, which is called myrmecochory, but yellow jackets (Vespula vulgaris) and harvestmen (order Opiliones) have both been observed dispersing the seeds at lower frequencies. Insect dispersal is aided by the presence of a conspicuous elaiosome, an oil-rich body attached to the seed, which is high in both lipids and oleic acid. The oleic acid induces corpse-carrying behavior in ants, causing them to bring the seeds to their nesting sites as if they were food. As ants visit several colonies of the plant, they bring genetically variable seeds back to a single location, which after germination results in a new population with relatively high genetic diversity. This has the ultimate effect of increasing biological fitness.

Although myrmecochory is by far the most common dispersal method, white-tailed deer have also been shown to disperse the seeds on rare occasions by ingestion and defecation. While ants only move seeds up to about 10 m (33 ft), deer have been observed to transport the seeds over 1 km (1,100 yd). This helps to explain post-agricultural colonization of forest sites by Trillium grandiflorum, as well as long distance gene flow which has been detected in other studies. Furthermore, it helps resolve what has been called "Reid's paradox", which states that migration during glaciation events must have been impossible for plants with dispersal rates under several hundred meters (yards) per year, such as Trillium grandiflorum. Thus occasional long distance dispersal events, such as by deer, probably helped save this and other species with otherwise short distance dispersal ability from extinction during the glaciations of the ice ages. Furthermore, nested clade analysis of cpDNA haplotypes has shown that Trillium grandiflorum is likely to have persisted through the last glacial period in two sites of refuge in the southeastern United States and that long distance dispersal was responsible for the post-glacial recolonization of northern areas.

In addition to the lateral dispersion (by invertebrates and deer) there is also importance in the fact that burial (vertical dispersion) by ants (or other vectors) increases the survival of new plants by two mechanisms. First, vertical dispersion ensures sufficient depth to preserve the seeds through their dormancy (trillium seeds are normally dormant for their first year). Second, vertical dispersion ensures adequate anchorage of the rhizomes. This is particularly important for young plants because their small rhizomes, with few & short roots, are easily dislodged (e.g. frost heaveal and other erosion factors) and desiccated.

=== Interaction with deer ===
Trillium grandiflorum as well as other trilliums are a favored food of white-tailed deer. Indeed, if trilliums are available deer will seek these plants, with a preference for T. grandiflorum, to the exclusion of others. In the course of normal browsing, deer consume larger individuals, leaving shorter ones behind. This information can be used to assess deer density and its effect on understory growth in general.

When foraging intensity increases, individuals become shorter each growing season due to the reduction in energy reserves from less photosynthetic production. One study determined that the ideal deer density in northeastern Illinois, based on T. grandiflorum as an indicator of overall understory health, is 4 to 6 animals per square kilometer (10 to 15 per sq. mi.). This is based on a 12 to 14 cm (5" to 6") stem height as an acceptable healthy height. In practice, deer densities as high as 30 deer per square kilometers (80 per sq. mi.) are known to occur in restricted or fractured habitat where natural control mechanisms (that is, predators like wolves) are lacking. Such densities, if maintained over more than a few years, can be very damaging to the understory and lead to extinction of some local understory plant populations.

=== Disease ===
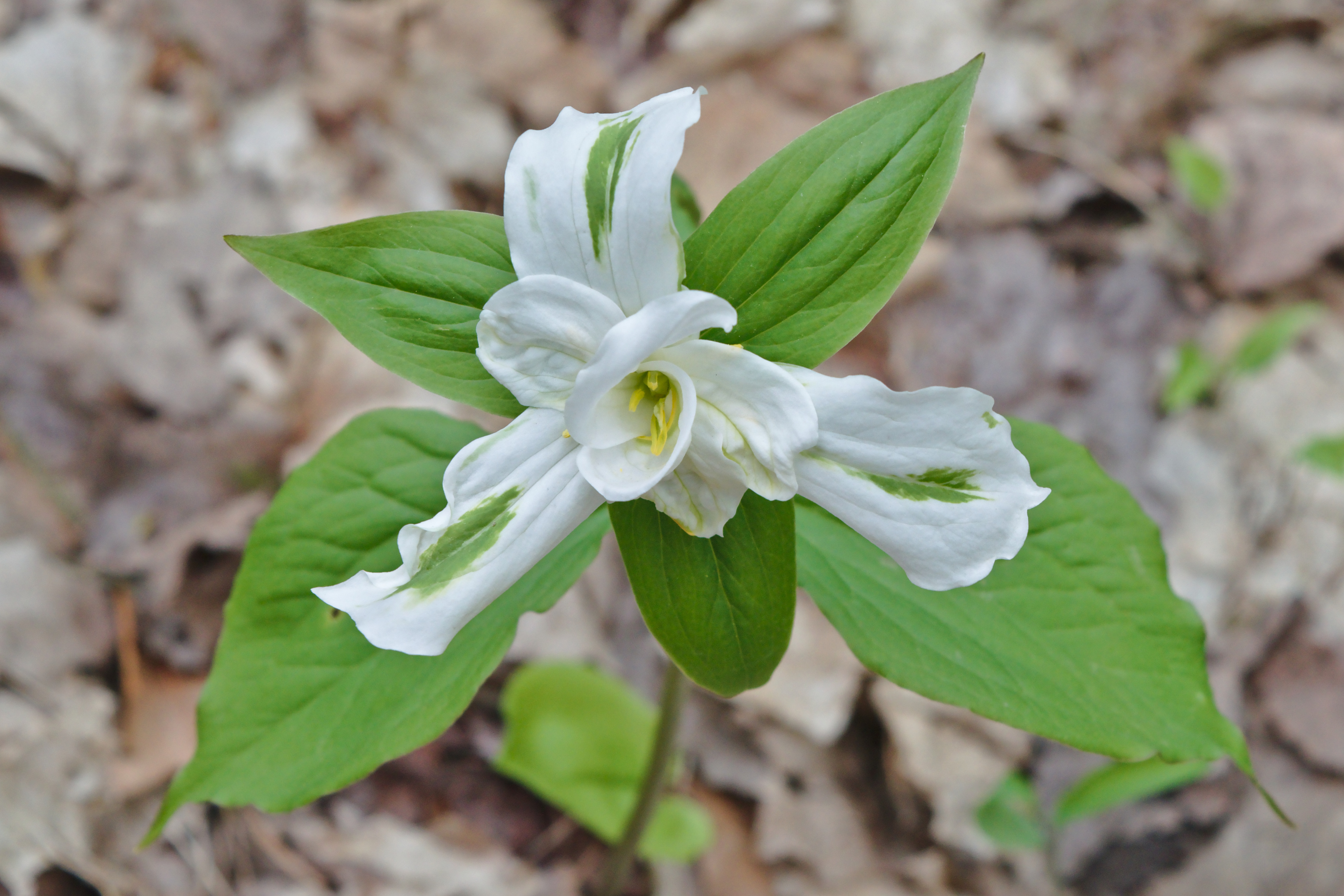
Diseased T. grandiflorum with virescent petals, extra petals, and other abnormalities

Trillium grandiflorum is susceptible to a greening disorder caused by bacterial organisms called phytoplasmas that alter the morphology of infected plants. Symptoms of phytoplasma infection include abnormal green markings on the petals (floral virescence), extra leaves (phyllody), and other abnormal characteristics. Infected populations occur throughout the species range but are prevalent in Ontario, Michigan, and New York.

For many years, this condition was thought to originate from mutation, and so many of these forms were given taxonomic names now known to be invalid. In 1971, Hooper, Case, and Meyers used electron microscopy to detect the presence of mycoplasma-like organisms (i.e., phytoplasmas) in T. grandiflorum with virescent petals. The means of transmission was not established but leafhoppers were suspected. As of November 2021, the insect vector for the disorder is unknown.

Phytoplasmas were positively identified in T. grandiflorum and T. erectum in Ontario in 2016 and later confirmed in 2019. Phylogenetic analysis supported the grouping of the phytoplasmas isolated from infected plants as a related strain of 'Candidatus Phytoplasma pruni' (subgroup 16SrIII-F) with 99% sequence identity. This subgroup of phytoplasmas is associated with various other diseases, including milkweed yellows, Vaccinium witches' broom, and potato purple top.

== Conservation ==
Some forms of the species have pink instead of white petals, while others with extra petals, also called "double" forms, are naturally quite common in the species, and these are especially popular with trillium gardeners. In fact, the species is the most popular of its genus in cultivation, which has led to conservation concerns due to the majority of commercially available plants being collected from the wild. A few regional governments in Canada and the United States have declared the plant vulnerable as a result. In Quebec, Trillium grandiflorum is legally listed as vulnerable primarily due to habitat destruction in forests neighboring the province's most populous regions. In New York, Trillium grandiflorum is exploitably vulnerable since it is "likely to become threatened in the near future throughout all or a significant portion of its range within the state if causal factors continue unchecked" (NYCRR §193.3).

Due to the popularity of Trillium grandiflorum as a garden specimen, conservation concerns have been raised as the vast majority of plants sold in commercial nurseries are believed to be collected from the wild. Indeed, there is little indication of any commercial nursery growth. Frederick and Roberta Case, botanists who specialize in trilliums, wrote in 1997, "to our knowledge, no true commercial quantity 'propagation' takes place at the present time." Such heavy collecting, combined with other pressures such as habitat destruction and grazing, may effectively endanger the plants in some areas.

As of October 2019, Trillium grandiflorum is globally secure. The species is vulnerable in Quebec, Georgia, and Illinois; and critically imperiled in Nova Scotia, Alabama, New Jersey, and South Carolina. In Maine, where its presence has not been verified in over 20 years, Trillium grandiflorum is listed as potentially extirpated.

== Cultivation ==
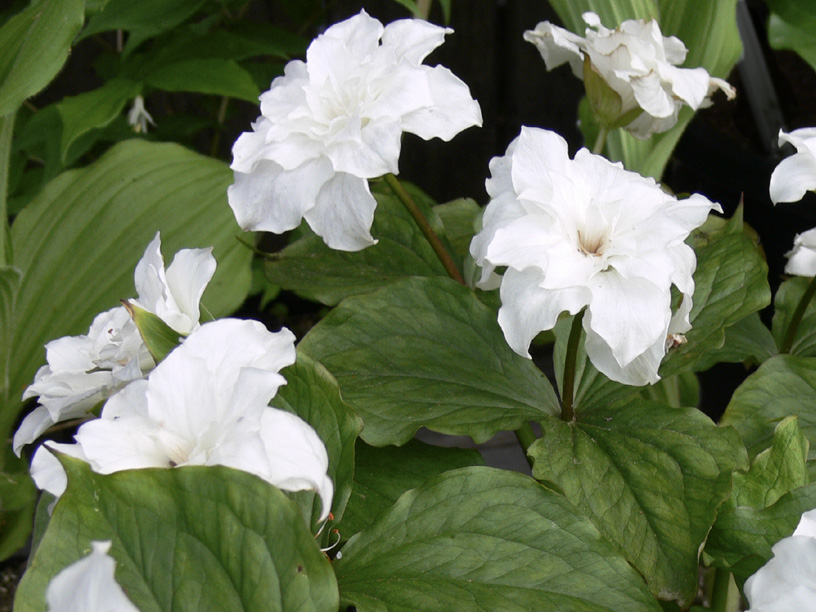
Double-flowered forms of T. grandiflorum are sought after by trillium enthusiasts

Trillium grandiflorum is one of the most popular trilliums in cultivation, primarily because of the size of its flowers and its relative ease of cultivation. Although not particularly demanding, its cultivation is a slow and rather uncertain process, due to usually slow growth, wide variations in growth speed and sometimes capricious germination rates. As a result, the vast majority of plants and rhizomes in commerce are collected in the wild, and such heavy collecting, combined with other pressures such as habitat destruction and grazing, may effectively endanger the plants in some areas. This also creates tensions between Trillium enthusiasts and conservation proponents. Transplantation (as with almost all non-weedy wild plants) is a delicate process, and in many cases results in the death of the plant. In cultivation, T. grandiflorum may flower in as little as 4 to 5 years after germination (compared to the usual 7 to 10 in the wild), but these cases appear to be exceptions rather than the rule. However, barring plant destruction, T. grandiflorum can continue flowering every year after it has begun. It is winter hardy in USDA zones 4-8.

A double-flowered cultivar, T. grandiflorum 'Pamela Copeland', was introduced to cultivation at the Mount Cuba Center and named for Mrs. Pamela du Pont Copeland, the center's founder.

This plant has gained the Royal Horticultural Society's Award of Garden Merit.

== Uses ==
The leaves were cooked and eaten by some Native Americans. The subterranean rootstalks were also chewed for various medical purposes.

== Culture ==
The large white trillium is a well-known and popular American flower. The Trillium species most often observed by citizen scientists is T. grandiflorum.

The flower's common name, wake-robin, was the title of American naturalist and essayist John Burroughs's first essay collection, Wake-Robin.

The official flag of Ontario's French-speaking minority, the Franco-Ontarians, incorporates a stylized trillium representing Ontario and a fleur-de-lis representing French Canadian heritage.

As a particularly conspicuous forest flower, T. grandiflorum was designated the provincial floral emblem of Ontario in 1937 (Floral Emblem Act), and as the state wild flower of Ohio in 1987. Professional soccer teams from Toronto and Columbus compete for the Trillium Cup every year.

As an official symbol of Ontario, a stylized trillium flower features prominently in the wordmark of the Government of Ontario and on the official flag of the province's French-speaking minority. Government agencies and programs also frequently incorporate the word "trillium" in their names, such as the Trillium Gift of Life Network (organ donation management agency) and the Trillium Book Award (an annual literary award sponsored by the provincial government). It is also frequently used by the Canadian Heraldic Authority to represent Ontario in grants of arms. Although a network of laws make picking wildflowers illegal in the province on any Crown or provincially owned land, it is not, unlike widely believed, specifically illegal (or necessarily harmful) to pick the species in Ontario.

== Bibliography ==
- Case, Frederick W.; Case, Roberta B. (1997). Trilliums. Portland, Oregon: Timber Press. ISBN 978-0-88192-374-2.
- Gledhill, David (2008). The Names of Plants (4th ed.). Cambridge University Press. ISBN 978-0-521-86645-3.
- Lamoureux, Gisèle (2002). Flore Printanière (in French). Saint-Henri-de-Lévis, Quebec: Fleurbec. pp. 48, 429–449. ISBN 978-2-920174-15-3.
- Lampley, Jayne A. (2021). A systematic and biogeographic study of Trillium (Melanthiaceae) (PhD). University of Tennessee.
- Lampley, Jayne A.; Gereau, Roy; Floden, Aaron; Schilling, Edward E. (2022-07-05). "A revised subgeneric classification of Trillium (Parideae, Melanthiaceae)". Phytotaxa. 552 (5): 278–286. Bibcode:2022Phytx.552..278L. doi:10.11646/phytotaxa.552.5.1. S2CID 250368253.
