= Pamela Cunningham Copeland =

American horticulturist (1906–2001)

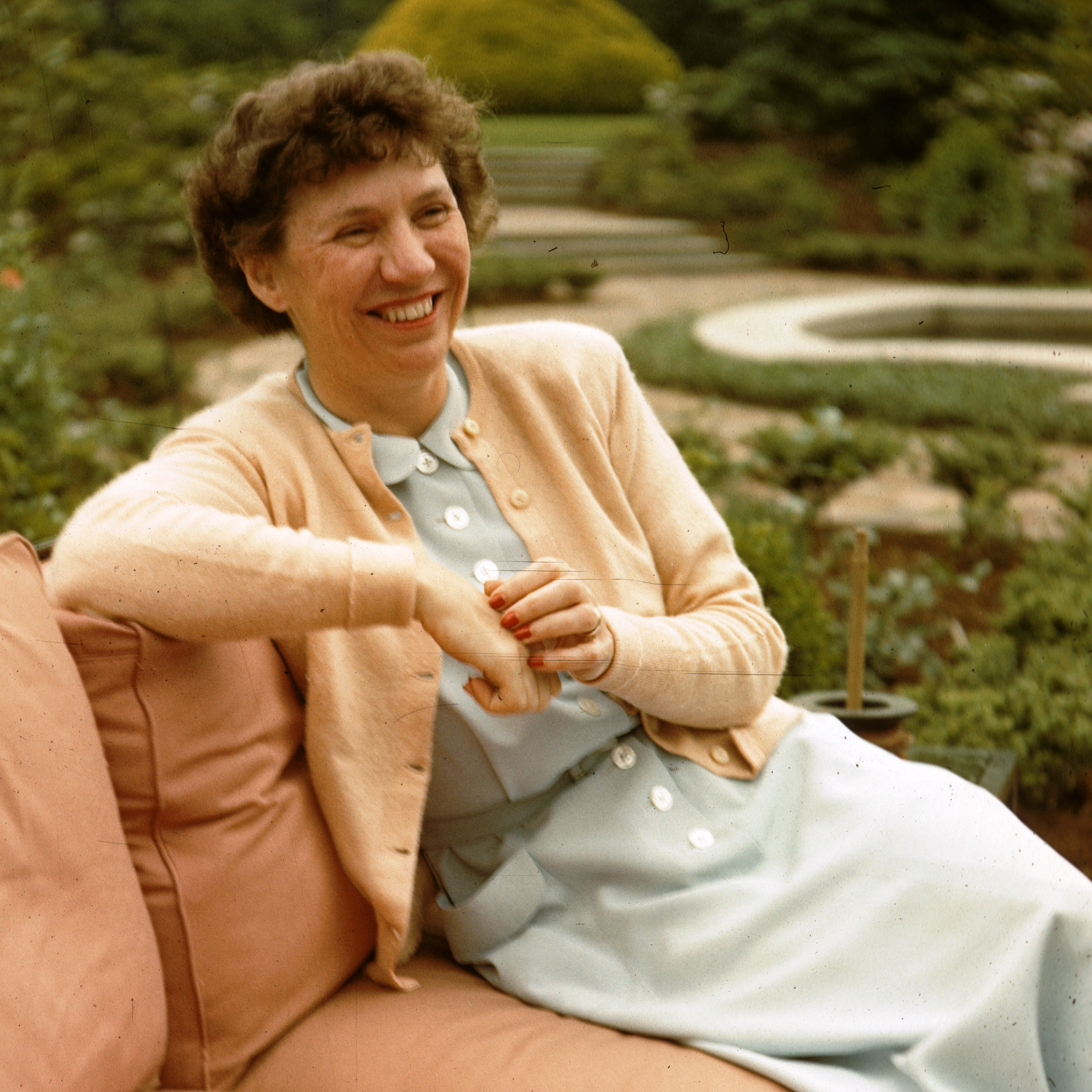
- Cunningham Copeland, 1960
- Born: May 5, 1906; Litchfield, Connecticut, U.S.
- Died: January 25, 2001 (aged 94); Mount Cuba, Greenville, Delaware, U.S.
- Occupations: Horticulture, Historic preservation, Philanthropy
- Spouse: Lammot du Pont Copeland (m. 1930)
- Children: 3
- Parent(s): Seymour and Stephanie Whitney Cunningham

Pamela Cunningham Copeland (May 5, 1906 – January 25, 2001) was an American horticulturist and historic preservationist, known for her philanthropy. Her home and gardens became Mt. Cuba Center, a public garden and research center for Appalachian Piedmont flora that was added to the National Register of Historic Places in 2003.

== Early life ==
Pamela Cunningham was born on May 5, 1906, to Seymour Cunningham and Stephanie (Whitney) Cunningham of 'Forked Chimney,' a home in Litchfield, Connecticut. She attended boarding schools in the United States and, from 1920 to 1921, in France. In 1924, she graduated from the Knox School of Cooperstown, New York. For several years she took lessons in voice at the Juilliard School in New York City, travelling to Paris in January 1929 to study voice.

== Marriage ==
While in Paris in 1929, Cunningham met Lammot du Pont Copeland. They married on February 1, 1930. From 1930 to 1935 they lived in Bridgeport, Connecticut. In 1935 they moved to Wilmington, Delaware. In 1935, they purchased 126.7 acres, the beginning of what eventually became a 250-acre estate. In 1937, they completed construction of the Mount Cuba house which became their permanent home. They had three children, Gerret van Sweringen Copeland, Lammot du Pont Copeland, Jr., and Louisa du Pont Copeland. Pamela Copeland was listed in Forbes Magazine in 1985 as one of the wealthiest people in America, with a fortune of $150 million based on holdings in the Du Pont Co.

== Mount Cuba ==
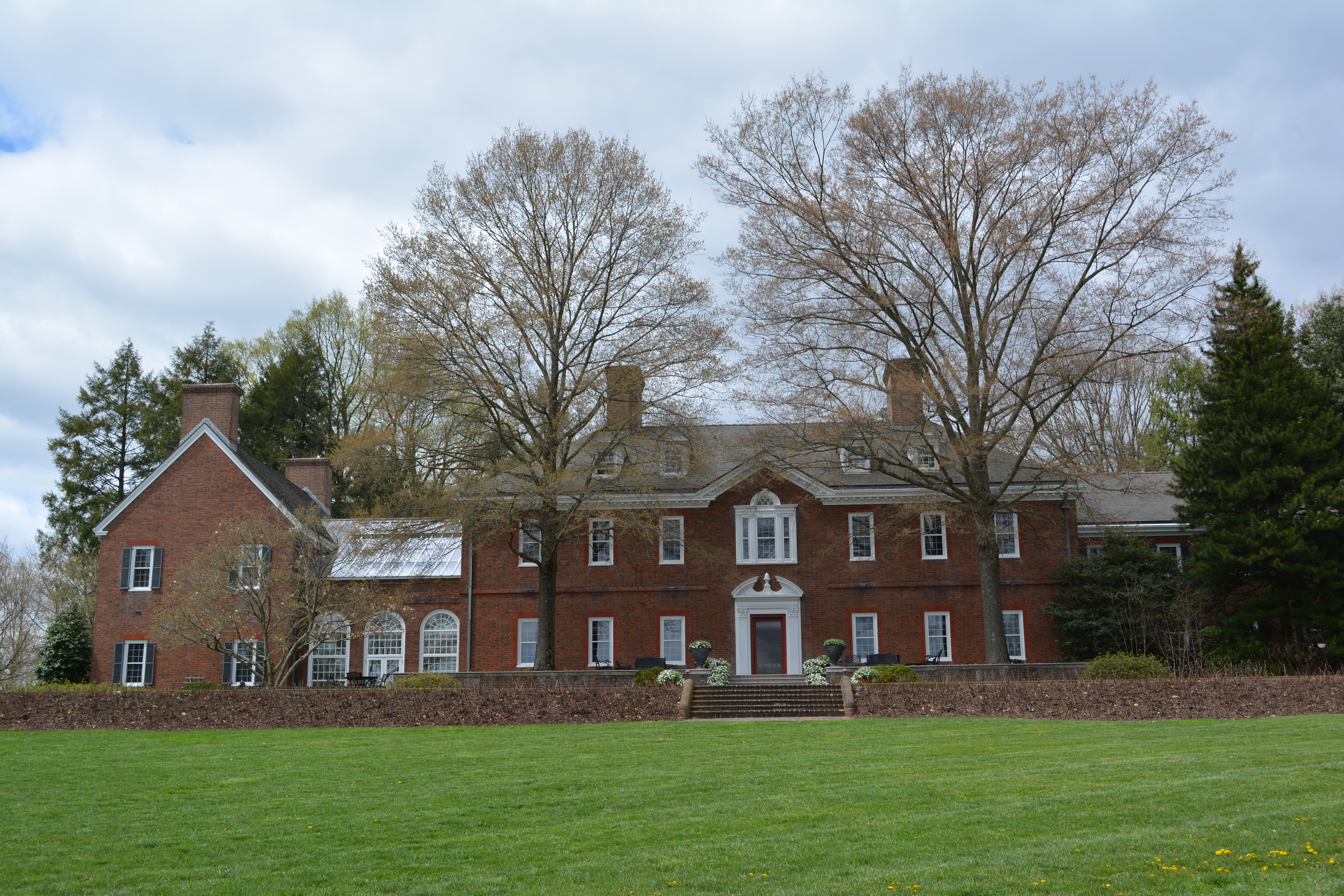
Main house at Mount Cuba

In 1937 the Copelands built Mount Cuba, at 3120 Barley Mill Rd., Greenville, New Castle County, Delaware, not far from Wilmington. It was designed by architects Victorine du Pont Homsey and Samuel Eldon Homsey. The house, in neo-Georgian style with extensive gardens, was furnished with eighteenth century American furniture and wood paneling. Copeland was well known for her collections of American furniture and Chinese export porcelain.

An initial plan for formal gardens at Mount Cuba was drawn up by Thomas Warren Sears when the house was built, but it was not completed. In 1951, Marian Cruger Coffin designed an eighteenth century-style garden. In the 1960s, the Copelands worked with landscape architect Seth Kelsey in developing a system of ponds, paths, and plants.

== Horticultural career ==
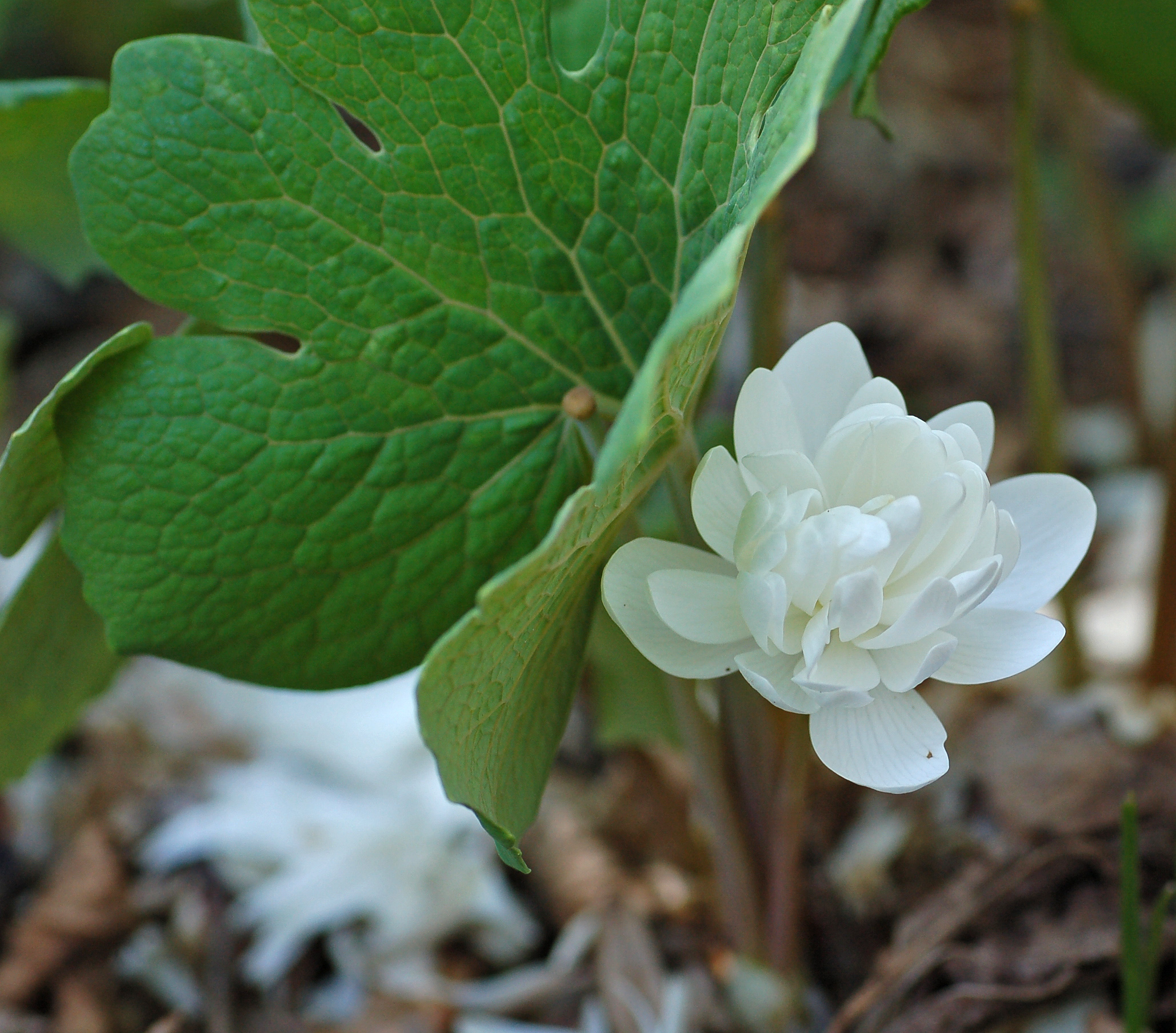
Bloodroot, Sanguinaria canadensis, Mt. Cuba Center

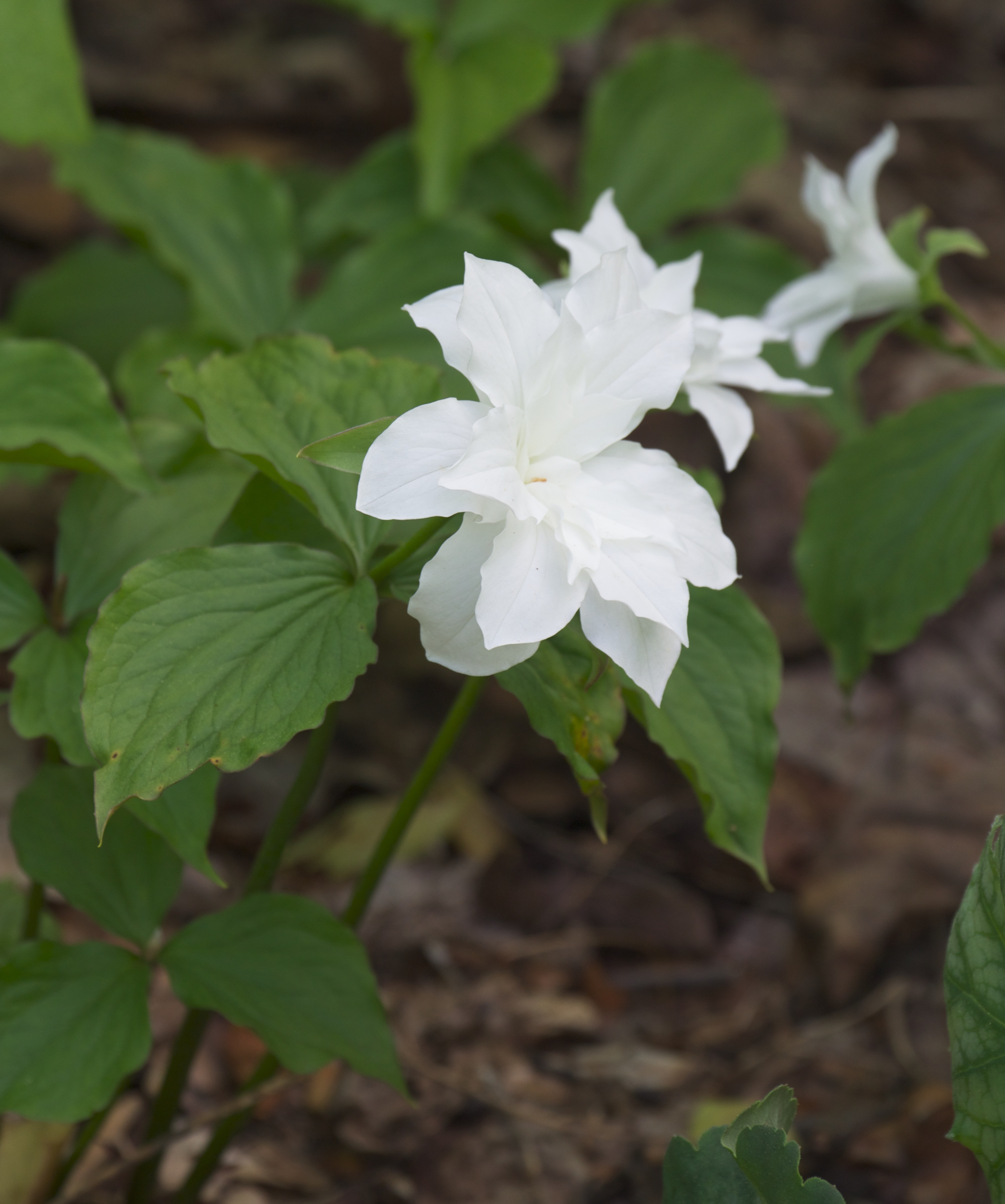
Trillium grandiflorum 'Pamela Copeland', Mt. Cuba Center

Copeland became interested in native plants from the Piedmont region of the United States. In the 1940s, she created a small wildflower garden at Mount Cuba, which was later expanded. In 1979, her work at Mount Cuba was recognized when the Pennsylvania Horticultural Society awarded her their Certificate of Merit. Copeland established the Mt. Cuba Center for the Study of Piedmont Flora in 1983, with Dr. Richard W. Lighty as its first director. The Center was endowed in 2003 as a foundation for preserving and propagating native plants from the Piedmont region.

Copeland competed for many years in the Philadelphia Flower Show, repeatedly winning the Pennsylvania Horticultural Society's Horticultural Sweepstakes Trophy for points in the Horticultural Classes (e.g. 1987, 1988). The trophy has since been named in her honor, as the Mrs. Lammot du Pont Copeland Horticultural Sweepstakes Trophy, "for the individual accumulating the greatest number of points in the Horticulture Classes." In 1991, she was awarded the Pennsylvania Horticultural Society's Distinguished Achievement Award, being recognized as "a leader in the native plant naturalistic garden movement and an active proponent of conservation efforts and proper stewardship of our natural resources."

In 1987, Copeland received the Achievement Award Medal of the Garden Club of America "for her establishment of the Mount Cuba Center, for her vision in preserving rare and endangered plants, and for her understanding of horticulture and conservation". Among other awards, she also received the Edith Wharton Women of Achievement Award for Garden Design in 1997.

In 1996, a variety of trillium was named for Copeland, Trillium grandiflorum 'Pamela Copeland', by Roberta and Frederick W. Case, Jr.

== Conservation and preservation ==
Copeland was involved in land conservation and historic preservation at a number of important sites, including the Red Clay Reservation in Hockessin, Delaware, Winterthur, Gunston Hall Plantation and the White House in Washington, D.C. She and her husband donated lands and money in the 1950s to create the Red Clay Reservation, preserving open lands that would otherwise have been developed. She was a charter member of the Board of Trustees at Winterthur Museum and Gardens, and the First Regent of Gunston Hall Plantation, the home of the George Mason family, from 1951 to 1960. She was a member of the Committee for the Preservation of the White House from 1970 to 1977, and worked with the White House Preservation Fund from 1984 to 1990.

She served as a trustee at the National Trust for Historic Preservation from 1958 to 1967, receiving the National Trust’s President’s Award in 2000. She served in a variety of positions with other organizations including Historic Deerfield, the Peabody Essex Museum, the council of the American Association of Museums, the Historical Society of Delaware, and the Decorative Arts Award Committee of the Henry Francis du Pont Award Committee. (She herself had received the Decorative Arts Award in 1986.)

Copeland received an honorary degree from the University of Delaware in 1988. Other honors and awards included the Philanthropist of the Year Award in 1988 and the Governor's Award for the Arts from the State of Delaware in 1988. In 1986, Copeland received the Henry Francis du Pont Award from Winterthur Museum for her "contributions of national significance to the knowledge, preservation, and enjoyment of American decorative arts, architecture, landscape design, and gardens."

== Published works ==
Copeland co-authored The Five George Masons: Patriots and Planters of Virginia and Maryland in 1975 (University of Virginia Press) with Richard K. MacMaster. A new edition of the book was published in 2016. Copeland also wrote a memoir of growing up in Litchfield, Recollections of Pamela Cunningham Copeland(1996).

Copeland received an honorary Doctorate of Humane Letters from Washington College in 1977. In a bequest in 2001, she and her daughter, Louisa Copeland Duemling, gave $500,000 to Washington College for the Lammot duPont Copeland Professorship at the Center for the Environment and Society.

== Porcelain collection ==
Copeland collected Chinese export porcelain for nearly sixty years, collecting over 200 delicate figures and containers featuring animals, birds, and people. She was named Collector of the Year by the Virginia Museum of Fine Arts in 1975. Before her death, she donated a significant part of her porcelain collection to the Peabody Essex Museum in Salem, Massachusetts. Featured in the Pamela Cunningham Copeland Gallery of the museum, the collection spans nearly 300 years, beginning during the reign of the Kangxi Emperor in the mid-1600s and ending with the Daoguang Emperor in 1850. It has been called "the world’s finest museum collection of Chinese porcelain figurines".

Copeland died at her home, Mount Cuba, Greenville, Delaware on January 25, 2001.
