= Lammot du Pont Copeland =

American businessman (1905–1983)

- Born: May 19, 1905; Christiana Hundred, Delaware, U.S.
- Died: July 1, 1983 (aged 78); Mt. Cuba Center, Greenville, Delaware, U.S.
- Education: Harvard College
- Occupation: President of DuPont
- Spouse: Pamela Cunningham (m. 1930)
- Children: Gerret van Sweringen Copeland; Lammot du Pont Copeland Jr. Louisa du Pont Copeland
- Parent(s): Charles Copeland; Louisa d'Andelot du Pont

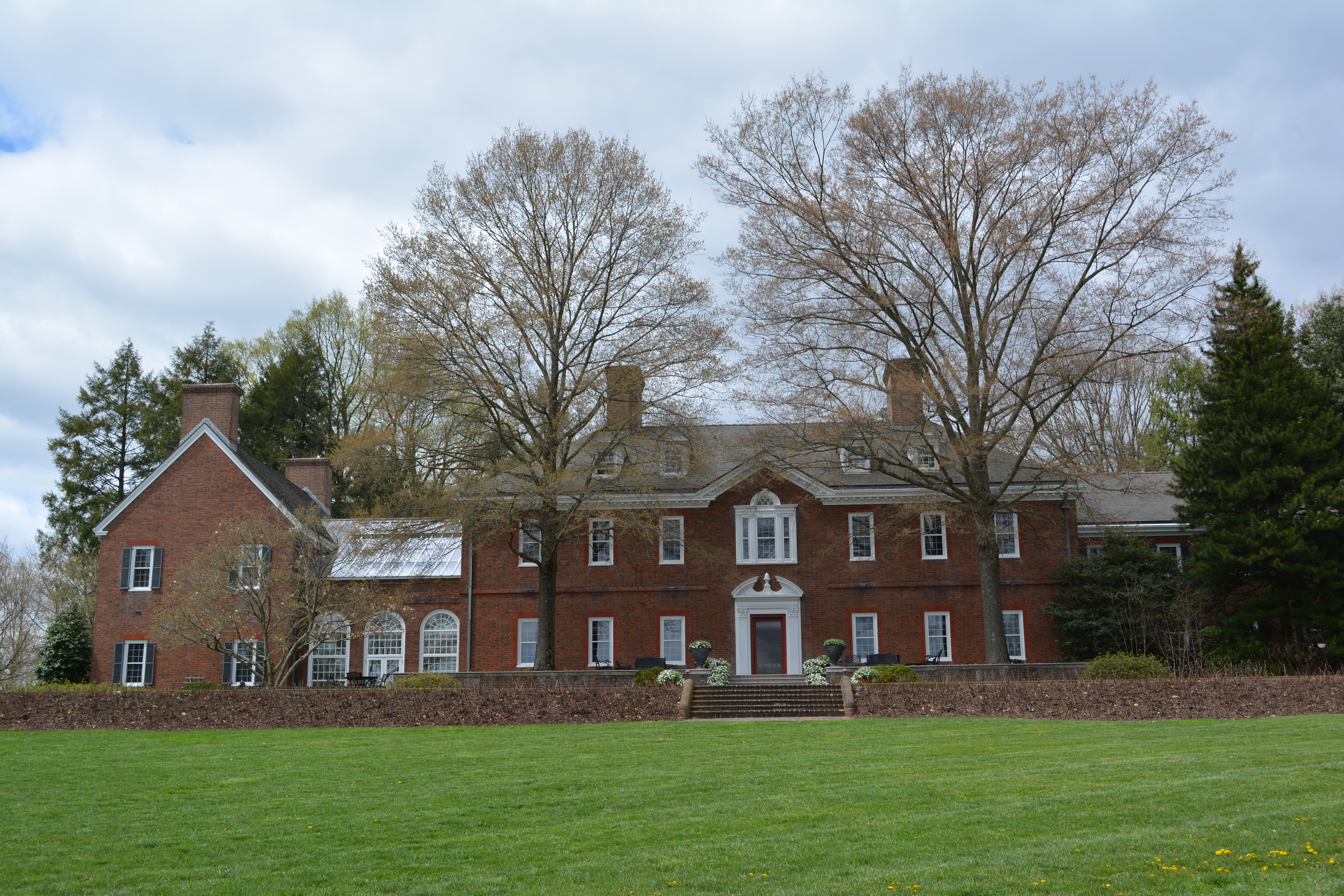
Copeland's former mansion, now part of Mt. Cuba Center

Lammot du Pont Copeland (May 19, 1905 – July 1, 1983) was an American businessman.

== Early life ==
Copeland was the great-great-grandson of DuPont's founder, Eleuthère Irénée du Pont, and he served as the company's 11th president from 1962 to 1967. His parents were Charles Copeland (March 30, 1867 in Englewood, New Jersey – February 3, 1944) and Louisa d'Andelot du Pont (January 25, 1868 in New Castle County, Delaware – August 10, 1926), who were married on February 16, 1904, at St. Amour in Wilmington, Delaware.

== Career ==
Copeland was a Harvard graduate and worked in the Fabrics and Finishings Department of DuPont before replacing his father on the Board of Directors in 1942. He was appointed to the Board’s Finance Committee and additionally served on the Development Department’s postwar planning board during World War II.

He appeared on the cover of TIME magazine on November 27, 1964.

In 1962, Copeland established the Andelot Fellowships at the University of Delaware. Together with Hugh Moore and William Henry Draper Jr., Copeland founded the Population Crisis Committee in 1965 (now "Population Action International") to "advance universal access to sexual and reproductive health and rights through advocacy, partnerships and the funding of changemakers".

Copeland was elected to the American Philosophical Society in 1978.

Copeland also had his portrait painted by artist Salvador Dalí.

== Personal life ==
He married Pamela Cunnigham (May 5, 1906 – January 25, 2001) on February 1, 1930, at Litchfield, Connecticut. She was the daughter of Mr. & Mrs. Seymour Cunningham of Litchfield. The Copelands had three children: Bouchaine Vineyards winery owner Gerret van Sweringen Copeland, Hollywood Citizen News and San Fernando Valley Valley Times owner Lammot du Pont Copeland Jr., and daughter Louisa du Pont Copeland, who married James Biddle. Grandchildren: Lammot duPont Copeland, III (January 31, 1961 - May 31, 2020).

In August 1969 through September 1971, the Copeland's resided at a midcentury modern ranch home 100 Kirk Road, Greenville, Delaware, which was originally part of the estate from Louis du Pont Irving, and was designed by architectural firm, Dollar, Bonner & Blake. The property was nominated for the National Register of Historic Places (N-11103.001), but was ultimately deemed ineligible as "Copeland’s residency at 100 Kirk Road took place inside the required fifty-year age requirement."

Following September 1971, moved to a larger colonial style mansion which now is a part of the Mt. Cuba Center, in Greenville, Delaware.

Awards and achievements
Preceded by Ara Parseghian	Cover of Time Magazine; 27 November 1964	Succeeded by Paul Carlson
