= Christopher Center =

Valparaiso University library

Christopher Center Library
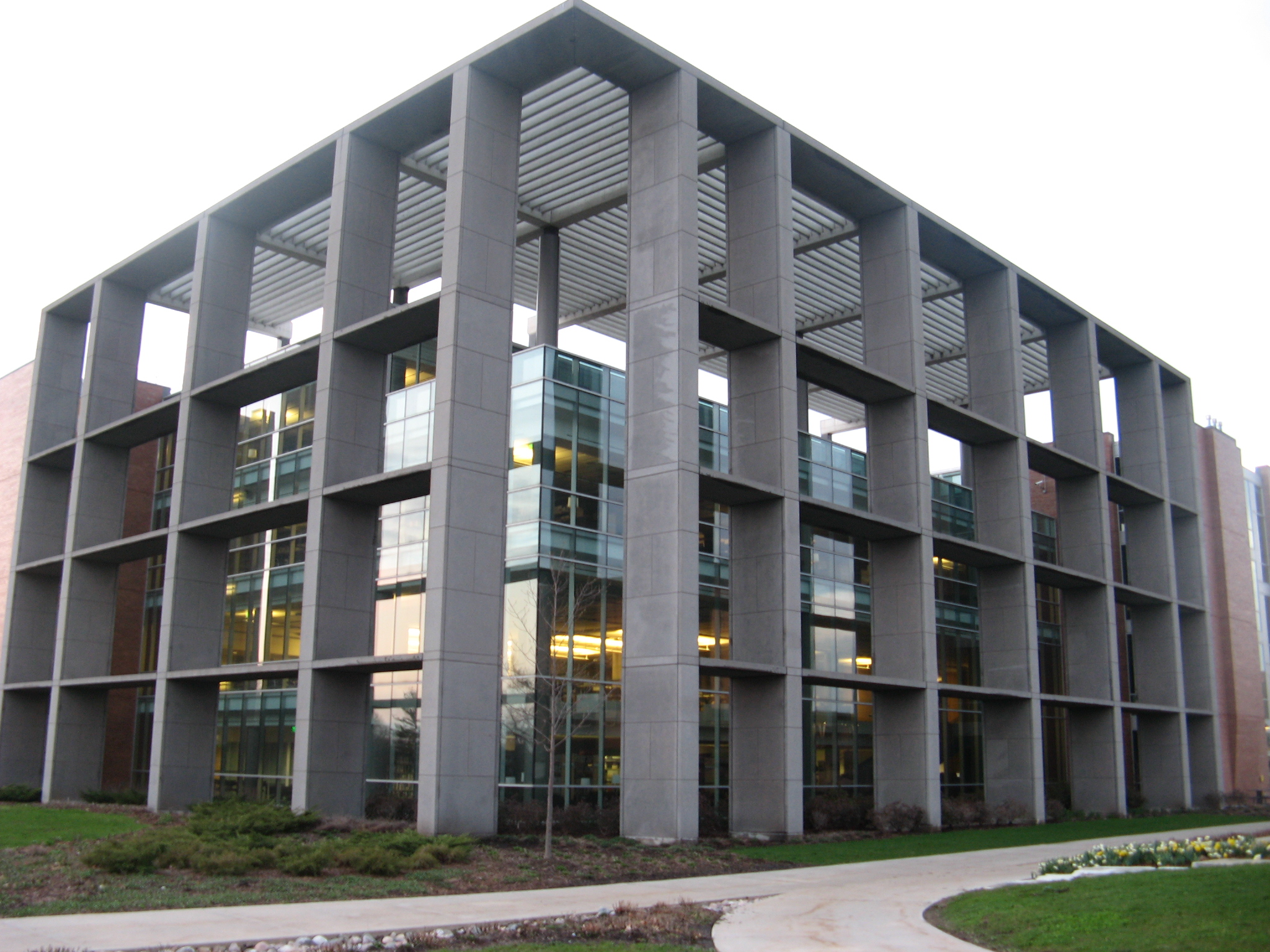
- Interactive map of the Christopher Center Library area

General information
- Type: Library
- Architectural style: Modern
- Location: Valparaiso, Indiana, United States
- Coordinates: 41.462705°N 87.043139°W
- Completed: 2004
- Owner: Valparaiso University
- Affiliation: Valparaiso University

Design and construction
- Architects: Esherick Homsey Dodge & Davis

Website
- www.valpo.edu/library/

The Christopher Center Library (also known as the Christopher Center for Library and Information Resources) is the library on the campus of Valparaiso University in Valparaiso, Indiana. The Christopher Center is Valparaiso's fourth library and replaces the former Henry F. Moellering Library, which was demolished in 2005 to make way for the forthcoming student union. As a result, the facilities holdings within the Christopher Center are now known as The Moellering Collection.

== Construction and architecture ==
Comprising 105,000 square feet (9,800 m^{2}) of space, the building was designed by Esherick Homsey Dodge & Davis of Chicago, which sought to "break the mold" of institutional libraries. Part of a $33 million project, the Christopher Center was made possible through gifts from alumni and friends, including a $16 million gift from Jay Christopher and his wife Doris. Support of the University's Three Goals, One Promise campaign made construction of the building possible. Among the major donors to the building project are those whose gifts are recognized in special areas of the building.

The grid-like structure flanking the south and east sides of the building's exterior provides an interesting appearance for the building while serving as a valuable sun screen. This protects the books from harmful, constant exposure to sun rays and helps soften the sunlight entering the two-story reading room overlooking Resurrection Meadow south of the chapel. At the same time, spaces throughout the facility are bathed in natural light.

== Building features ==
The wireless building accommodates current study preferences by replacing study carrels with soft furniture in "living room" settings, several complete with fireplaces. Food and beverages are available at a café on the premises. There are some 2,400 data ports and 88 wireless access points in the building, all connected by 42 miles (68 km) of data cable. Computer clusters are located amply throughout the building, totaling over 250 individual computers available for student use. Sunshades also automatically lower when too much sunlight is entering the building, and raise when it is dark outside.

Books and other traditional information resources mix with computers and access to the Internet on every floor. The computer-driven, robotic Automated Storage and Retrieval System uses space efficiently and allowed the overall shelving capacity in the center to increase to 600,000 volumes without having to increase the size of the building.

== Automated storage and retrieval system ==
Perhaps the best representation of Christopher Center's integration of traditional library services with current technology is the Automated Storage and Retrieval System (ASRS). This combination of robotics and computer system has the capacity to store 300,000 files. Two stories high, the system features bins stacked along two aisles. Materials that are used infrequently by students or faculty are maintained in this location.

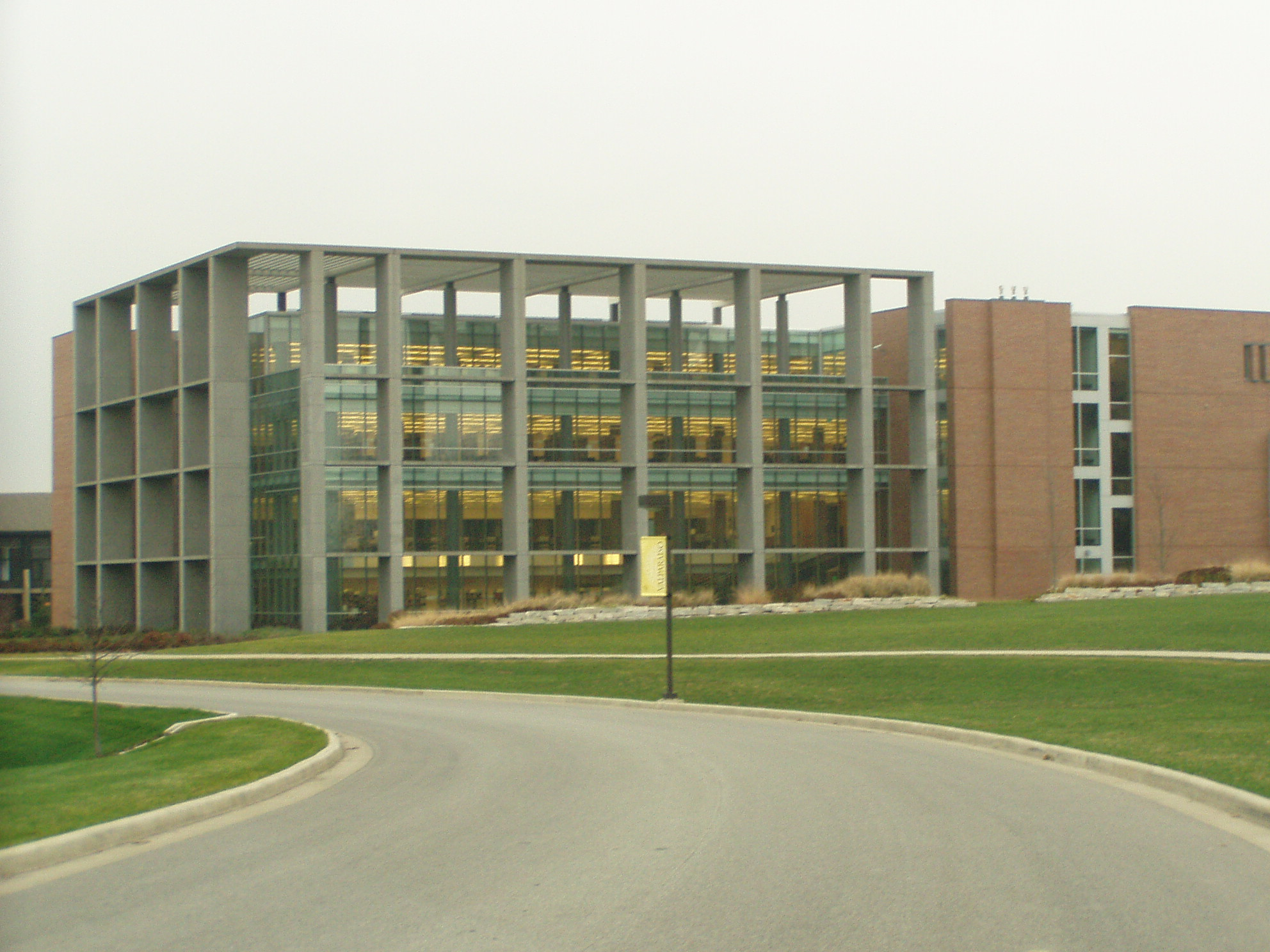
Larger view of the library

When one of the 60,000 items is requested, the robotic system locates and retrieves the publication in about 15 seconds. Using a bar code logged into it, the management computer system runs the robot and simultaneously registers the volume's current location in the one of its 1,872 bins. Designed like a combination car-jack and fork lift, the computer-controlled cranes move along the aisles and up or down the stacks of bins to retrieve the requested material and place it on a tray desk in the main circulation area. Provided by a gift from alumnus Herbert F. Stride, this automated storage and retrieval system is one of the first five installed for use in libraries in the nation.

== Collections ==
The Christopher Center Special Collections have a particular strength in Reformation-era theology, with an emphasis on collecting various early editions of the writings of Martin Luther.

Included in the general collections are several decades' worth of back issues of journals and government documents.

The Center collects official government maps from the U.S. Geological Survey, National Imagery and Mapping Agency, the CIA, the Department of Agriculture and the Department of the Interior. It is an Army Map Service depository for a special collection of 70,000 maps. The collection also contains National Geographic Society, maps as well as local, state, national and international maps.

There are 2,200 LPs in the center's audio/visual collection, ranging from classical to blues, retro and jazz. In total, there are over 2,300 sound recordings (CDs, LPs, cassette tapes), 1,900 visual recordings (DVDs and VHS tapes), and 1,400 CD-ROMs for academic and recreational purposes.
