= Shelice Tolbert =

American lawyer

Shelice R. Tolbert
- Born: Gary, Indiana
- Education: Wittenberg University, 1997 Valparaiso University, J.D., 2000
- Spouse: Michael E. Tolbert
- Website: https://tolbertlegal.com/

Shelice R. Tolbert is an American lawyer and a partner at Tolbert & Tolbert, an African American owned, Northwest Indiana, faith-based, law firm established in 2015. She also served on the Indiana Judges and Lawyers Assistance Program Committee from 2011 to 2014 and the Indiana State Board of Law Examiners in 2014. Tolbert was the defense lawyer for the son of Louis Farrakhan. The case involved a car accident and damages worth over $800,000. In 2024, she was named one of Indiana's Super Lawyers in the category of Civil Litigation.

== Education ==
Born in Gary, Indiana, Tolbert attended Gary's West Side High School and graduated in 1993. After high school, she graduated from Wittenberg University in 1997 with a degree in Business Management. Tolbert obtained her Juris Doctor from Valparaiso School of Law in 2000. She is also a graduate of the Leadership Northwest Indiana (LNI) program at Purdue University Northwest.

== Legal career ==
Tolbert started practicing law in Indiana in 2000, concentrating civil litigation, municipal law, contracts, personal injury, and police liability in excessive use of force cases. Tolbert has served as the President of the James C. Kimbrough Minority Bar Association, an organization that supports and advocates for Black legal professionals of Northwest Indiana. In 2011, Tolbert served on the transition team for Karen Freeman-Wilson, incoming Mayor of Gary, Indiana. From 2014 to 2015, she served as the President of the Porter County Chapter of the American Inns of Court. In 2015, she was the President Elect of the Lake County Bar Association. She has also served as the district representative on the Board of Governors of the Indiana State Bar Association. From 2007 to 2017, she worked as an adjunct professor of Trial Practice at Valparaiso University School of Law.

== Awards ==
In 2012, Tolbert was recognized as a Mover and Shaker of Northwest Indiana by Building Indiana magazine. She was awarded the 2012 Valparaiso University Black Students Association's Alumni Award. She was also nominated as a Northwest Indiana Influential Women in Business in the Legal category in 2011, 2012, and 2014. In 2013 and 2014, she was chosen as a Rising Star by the Indiana Super Lawyers. In 2015, she received an Indiana Super Lawyer designation in the area of Insurance Defense Litigation. In 2017, her firm received the Katie Hall Educational Foundation Co-Merit of Distinction Award. Two years later, the Indiana State Bar Association honored her with the Women in Law Recognition Award.

In 2023, Tolbert was honored as one of 23 attorneys in Indiana that contributed to diversifying the legal profession in the state.

Tolbert is an elected member of the American Law Institute. She was added to a list of Indiana's Super Lawyers in the category of Civil Litigation in 2024.

== Community involvement ==
Tolbert is involved in the United Negro College Fund Northwest Indiana Advisory Council and she also serves as the chair of the council. She is also an active member of the Gary Alumnae chapter of Delta Sigma Theta sorority, a non-profit organization whose purpose is to provide assistance and support through established programs in local communities. She is a past member of the Board of Directors for the Lake Area United Way and currently serves on the Board of the Gary Literacy Coalition. She has been involved with the scholarship committee of the Legacy Foundation since 2008.

== Personal life ==
She married Michael E. Tolbert in 2006. Her husband is also a graduate of the Valparaiso University School of Law, lawyer and her co-partner at Tolbert & Tolbert. The couple first met in 1987 when they were children in Gary, Indiana. They started Tolbert & Tolbert LLC on 26 January 2015.
