= Victorine du Pont Homsey =

American architect

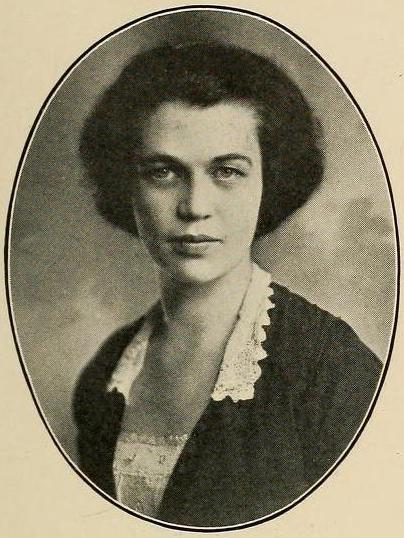
- Victorine du Pont in 1923
- Born: Victorine du Pont; November 27, 1900; Grosse Point, Michigan, US
- Died: January 6, 1998 (aged 97); Hockessin, Delaware, US
- Education: Wellesley College (BA 1923), Smith College (MA)
- Occupation: Architect
- Known for: First woman to be a Fellow of the American Institute of Architects
- Family: du Pont family

Victorine du Pont Homsey (November 27, 1900 – January 6, 1998) was an American architect and member of the du Pont family. A principal in Victorine & Samuel Homsey, she was elected a Fellow of the American Institute of Architects (FAIA) in 1967, the first woman architect from Delaware and only the eighth woman nationwide to achieve that honor.

== Life ==
She was born in Grosse Pointe, Michigan, to Antoine Biderman (or Bidermann) du Pont, Jr., and Mary Ethel (Clark) du Pont. The Du Ponts were an old and well-to-do family; her great-grandfather was the industrialist Alfred V. du Pont. She attended Wellesley College, where she earned her undergraduate degree in 1923. She went on to receive her certificate in architecture in 1925 from the Cambridge School of Domestic and Landscape Architecture for Women (which was not yet a degree-granting institution); ten years later, after the school became affiliated with Smith College, she was awarded the M. Arch degree.

After completing her studies at the Cambridge School in 1925, she worked as a drafter at the architectural firm of Allen & Collens in Boston (1926–27), and there she met Samuel Homsey, whom she married in 1929.

Victorine and Samuel moved to Wilmington, Delaware, and in 1935, they opened a firm known as Victorine & Samuel Homsey (later Victorine & Samuel Homsey, Inc.). They were perhaps the first Delaware architects to work in the International Style, and one of their early house designs was chosen by the Museum of Modern Art to represent the International Style in a 1938 Paris exhibition. In general, however, their style was more eclectic, and in part because they began their careers during the Great Depression, they felt it was important for architects to work on developing ways to work economically and with new materials. In 1950, one of their house designs for small sites was included in a "Five-Star" series developed by Better Homes and Gardens, for which the working drawings and specifications could be purchased by mail for $5.
