= Jay Christopher =

Armenian-American businessman

Jay W. Christopher
- Education: Valparaiso University
- Known for: Co-Founder of Pampered Chef
- Title: Founder of Thatcher Technology Group
- Spouse: Doris (m. 1967)

Jay W. Christopher is chairman and founder of Thatcher Technology Group in Naperville, Illinois, a funder and incubator for start up companies.

In 1980, he was cofounder with his wife Doris of "The Pampered Chef” a direct sales company for fine kitchen tools. He served as executive vice president of corporate development. The company was sold to Berkshire Hathaway, Warren Buffett, in 2002. He previously held positions with the Hammond Organ Company, Keebler Co., Lien Services, Marian Joy Rehabilitation Hospital and founded Thatcher Technology Group, Inc.

== Early life and education ==
Christopher is a 1967 graduate of Valparaiso University.

== Philanthropy ==
Christopher has a legacy of giving to educational institutions including Valparaiso University, Concordia University-Chicago and University of Illinois-Champaign. They were the principal donors, contributing $15 million to the Christopher Center for Library and Information Resources, and contributed significantly to the Kallay-Christopher Geography and Meteorology building. They have also donated generously to the National Foundation for Teaching Entrepreneurship, with over $250,000 given. Christopher and his wife divorced in 2012. They resided in Hinsdale, Illinois.

Christopher is chairman of the Chicagoland Lutheran Educational Foundation. A member of numerous other civic and professional organizations, Christopher was the 2000 Entrepreneur of the Year for the National Foundation for Teaching Entrepreneurship, and was the recipient of an honorary doctor of laws degree from Valparaiso University in 1999. He continues to serve as a member of the National Council of Valpo's College of Business Administration.
