= George W. Homsey =

American architect (1926–2019)

George W. Homsey, FAIA (March 14, 1926 - April 29, 2019) was an American architect based in the San Francisco, California Bay Area. A recipient of a Bachelor of Architecture from the University of California School of Architecture in 1951, Homsey joined Joseph Esherick in 1952 followed by Peter Dodge in 1956 and Chuck Davis in 1962 to form the architectural firm Escherick Homsey Dodge and Davis, EHDD in 1973. Homsey is committed to creating places and to challenges unique in the urban and sub-urban environment and is considered a master of "weaving and manipulating design decisions into architecture that fits its location". In 2006 he was the recipient of the Maybeck Award for lifetime achievement in architectural design.

== Notable buildings with Homsey as design architect ==
George W. Homsey, FAIA, along with Jim McLane and Tito Patri, FASLA, were among the consultants for "A Sense of Place: Design Guidelines for Yosemite Valley," prepared by the National Park Service, Yosemite National Park, California.

George Homsey and his firm EHDD became known for designing and siting memorable works of Organic Architecture and worked on numerous important, notable buildings where he was the design architect or partner in charge that have drawn the attention of experts in this style including:

- Sea Ranch homes of the 1960s
- Rubin House (1961)
- BART Stations (1960–1979)
- Garfield Elementary School (1979)
- Governor's Corner housing, Stanford University (1978)
- Design Guidelines for Yosemite National Park
