= EHDD =

American Architecture & Urban Planning Firm

- Formerly: Esherick Homsey Dodge and Davis
- Type: Architects
- Founded: 1946
- Founder: Joseph Esherick
- Headquarters: San Francisco, California, United States
- Services: Architecture; Interiors; Planning; Urban Design
- Website: www.ehdd.com

Esherick Homsey Dodge and Davis (also known as EHDD Architecture) is a United States–based architecture, interiors, planning and urban design firm. EHDD is ranked among the top 20 architecture firms in the San Francisco Bay Area where it is headquartered.

== History ==
EHDD grew out of a practice founded in 1946 by the late American architect Joseph Esherick (1914–1998). Esherick began his career designing houses for the architect Gardner Dailey and maintained an interest in private residences throughout his life. He taught at the University of California, Berkeley (1952–1985), was among the faculty who supported William Wurster's founding of the College of Environmental Design in 1959, and served as the chair of the Architecture Department (1976–1982). Esherick received the AIA Gold Medal in 1989 and the first AIA California Council Maybeck Award in 1992.

In 1951, George W. Homsey joined Joseph Esherick, followed by the addition of Peter Dodge in 1956, and Chuck Davis in 1962. In 1963, the firm became Joseph Esherick and Associates reflecting their partnership. The firm's early years were primarily devoted to residential work. By the mid-1960s, the firm was taking on larger and more complex projects, particularly in higher education but in other sectors as well. In 1972, Joseph Esherick and Associates became Esherick Homsey Dodge and Davis.

In the late 1970s, the firm was commissioned to design Monterey Bay Aquarium which opened in 1984 and won the National Honor Award from the American Institute of Architects (AIA) in 1988. This proved to be a seminal project, expanding the firm's involvement in large aquarium, zoo and museum projects. Through the 1980s and continuing to the present, the firm's work has included a wide range of building types and scales in both the public and private sectors. Esherick Homsey Dodge and Davis was given the AIA California Council Firm Award in 1980 and the AIA National Firm of the Year Award in 1986. The AIA California Council awarded the Maybeck Award to Chuck Davis in 2003 and to George Homsey in 2006. Peter Dodge received the AIA Council Lifetime Achievement Award for Distinguished Service in 2008.

With Joseph Esherick's passing in 1998, the firm initiated changes to its management structure and began implementing a succession plan. George Homsey and Peter Dodge transitioned to independent consultants in 1995. Subsequently, Duncan Ballash, Jennifer Devlin, and Marc L'Italien were appointed as principals in 2001, and Scott Shell joined as a principal in 2006. While building on the legacy of the founder and original principals, in order to better reflect the changes in leadership, the firm adopted the name EHDD architecture.

Since its inception, the firm has garnered more than 200 design awards and honors. In addition to 11 LEED certified buildings, among them 5 LEED Platinum certified projects, the firm has been awarded over 30 sustainable design awards including three Center for the Built Environment awards and three AIA Committee on the Environment (COTE) Top Ten Green Building awards.

== Notable buildings ==
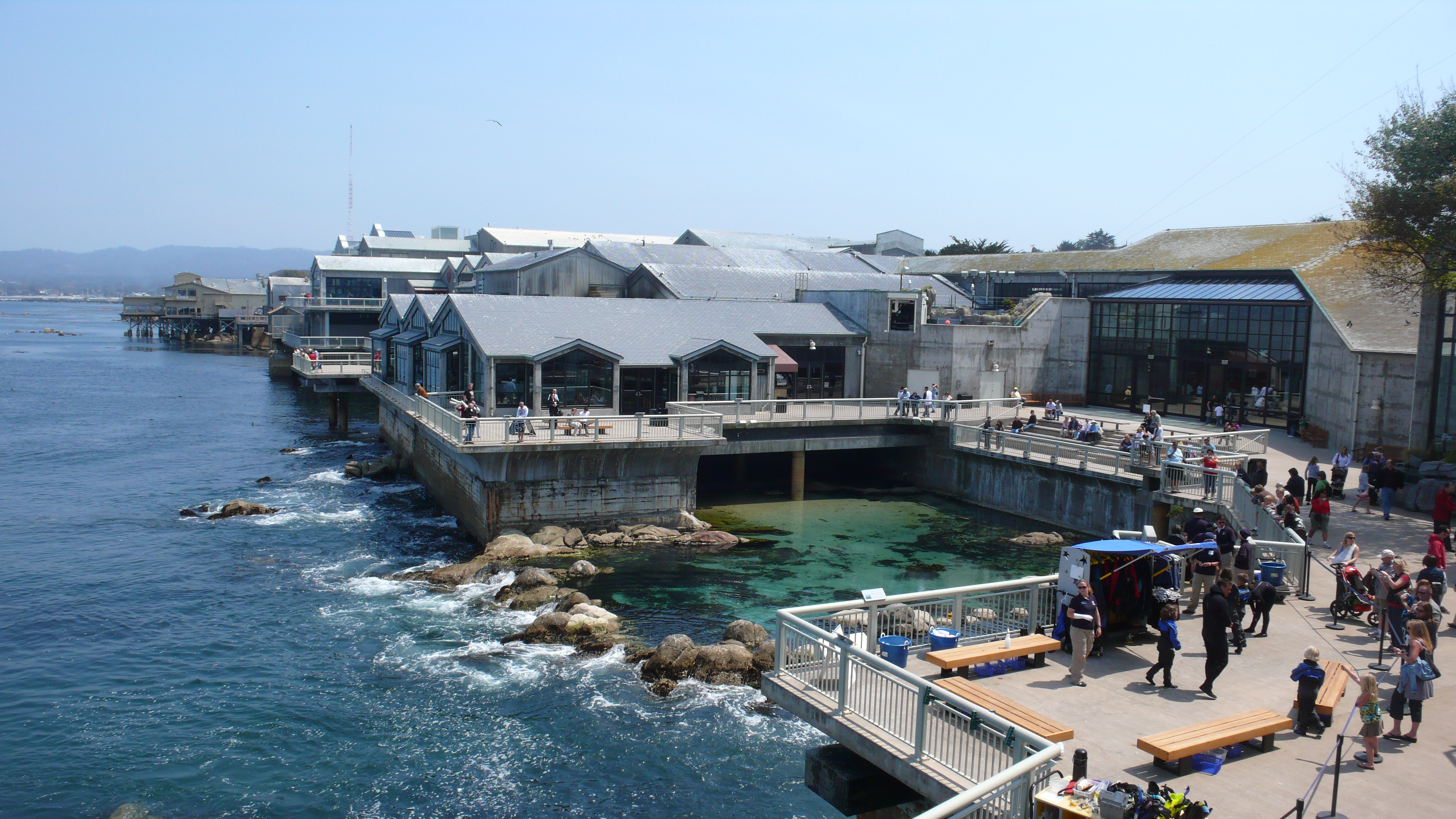
Monterey Bay Aquarium

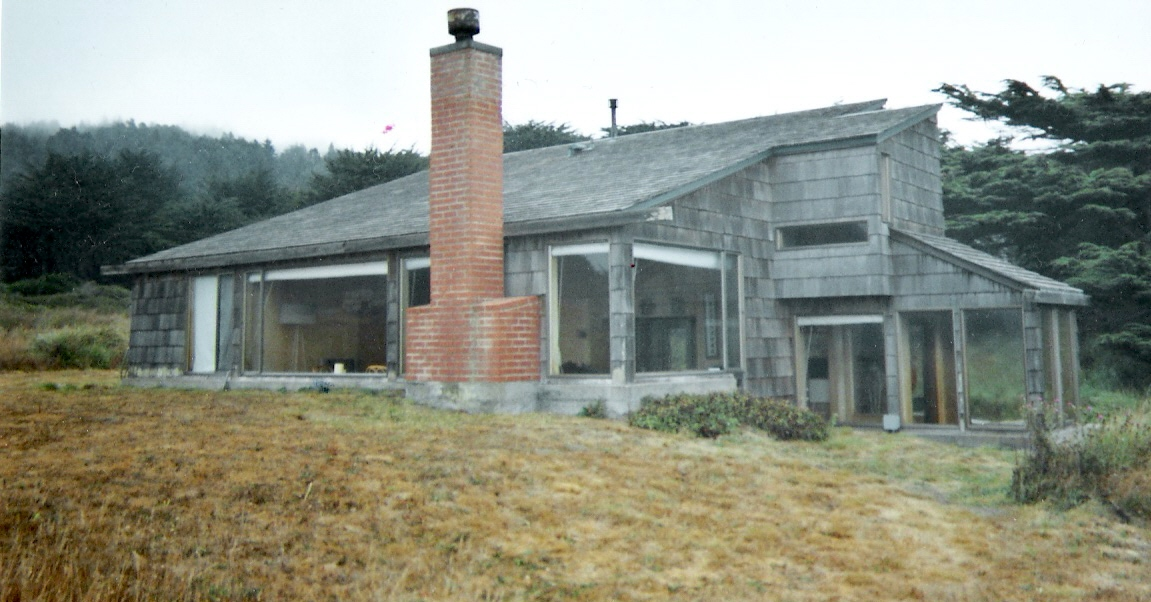
The Sea Ranch house

- Aquarium of the Pacific
- Audubon Center at Debs Park
- Bermak House, Oakland, California
- California Science Center, Ecosystems Wing (with ZGF)
- California State University, Bakersfield, Walter Stiern Library
- California State University, Monterey Bay, Tanimura and Antle Family Memorial Library
- Carnegie Institution for Science, Department of Global Ecology (Stanford, California)
- Cary House
- Chartwell School
- City College of San Francisco, Chinatown/North Beach Campus (with Barcelon and Jang)
- David and Lucile Packard Foundation (The) [2011]
- Exploratorium at Piers 15 / 17
- F10 House
- Lincoln Park Zoo, Pritzker Family Children's Zoo
- Marin Country Day School
- Mills College, Betty Irene Moore Natural Sciences Building
- Monterey Bay Aquarium
- Napier House
- National Mississippi River Museum & Aquarium
- National Museum of Marine Biology & Aquarium (Taiwan)
- One Hawthorne
- Residences at Spanish Bay (The)
- San Mateo Public Library
- Schneider House (The Sea Ranch)
- Sea Ranch (The)
- Shedd Aquarium
- Stanford University, Kavli Institute for Particle Astrophysics and Cosmology
- University of California, Berkeley, Clark Kerr Campus Renewal
- University of California, Berkeley, College of Environmental Design (Bauer Wurster Hall)
- University of California, Berkeley, Main Library Complex, Doe/Moffitt Libraries
- University of California, Berkeley, Residence Halls Units
- University of California, Merced, Science + Engineering Building
- University of California, San Diego, Supercomputer Center Expansion
- University of California, San Francisco, Kalmanovitz Library
- University of California, Santa Barbara, Ocean Science Education Building [2011]
- University of California, Santa Cruz, Colleges 9 & 10 Residences and Dining Hall / University Center
- University of California, Santa Cruz, Science Library
- University of California, Santa Cruz, Biomedical Sciences Building [2012]
- University of California, Santa Cruz, Stevenson College
- Utah State University, Logan, Merrill-Cazier Library
- Valparaiso University, Indiana, Christopher Center for Library and Information Resources

== Awards ==
- AIA National Honor Award, 1988
- AIA National Firm of the Year Award, 1986
- Chartwell School [2009]
- Carnegie Institution for Science, Department of Global Ecology [2007]
- F10 House [2004]
- AIA SF Honor Award, 2011 – Marin Country Day School, Step 2
- Kavli Institute for Particle Astrophysics and Cosmology
- Chartwell School
- Carnegie Institution for Science, Department of Global Ecology
- The Chicago Athenaeum: Museum of Architecture and Design / The European Centre for Architecture Art Design and Urban Studies Design Excellence Award, 2007 – Lincoln Park Zoo, Pritzker Family Children’s Zoo
