= Mt. Cuba Center =

Historic house in Delaware, United States

- U.S. National Register of Historic Places
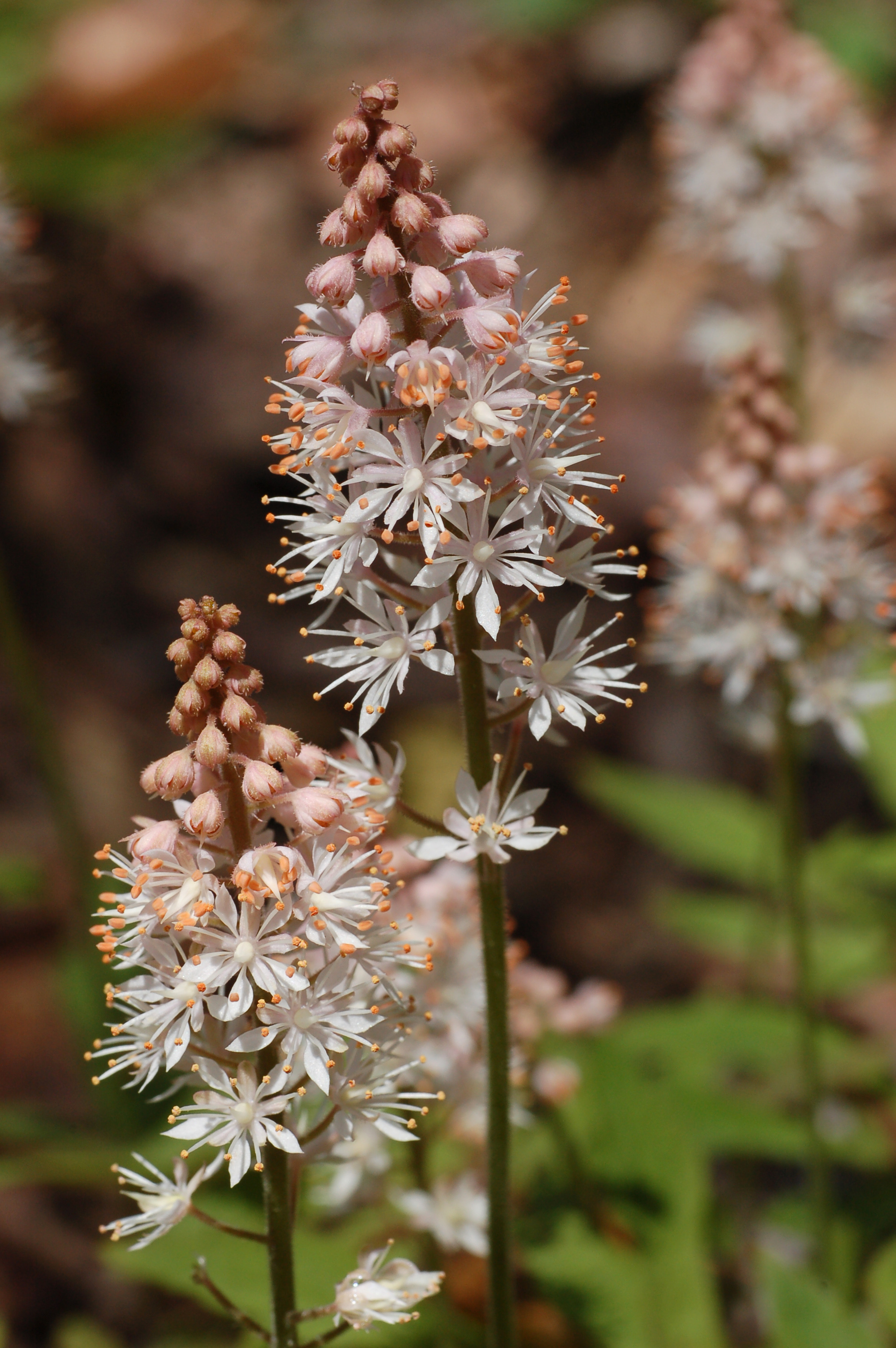
- The flowers of the Foamflower (Tiarella). Photo taken at the Mt. Cuba Center where it was identified

- Location within Delaware Location within the United States
- Location: 3120 Barley Mill Rd.
- Nearest city: Hockessin, Delaware
- Coordinates: 39.78841°N 75.64828°W
- Area: 7.4 acres (3.0 ha)
- Built: 1937
- Built by: J. S. Cornell & Son
- Architect: Victorine & Samuel Homsey (house); Thomas Warren Sears (landscape)
- Architectural style: Colonial Revival
- Website: mtcubacenter.org
- NRHP reference No.: 03000172
- Added to NRHP: April 2, 2003

Mt. Cuba Center is a non-profit botanical garden located in Hockessin, Delaware, near Wilmington, in the gently rolling hills of the Delaware Piedmont. Its woodland gardens produce some of the most spectacular displays of wildflowers in the mid-Atlantic region. Mt. Cuba is open to the public from April through November for general admission, guided tours and special programs. Education courses, including a Certificate in Ecological Gardening, are offered year-round.

== History ==
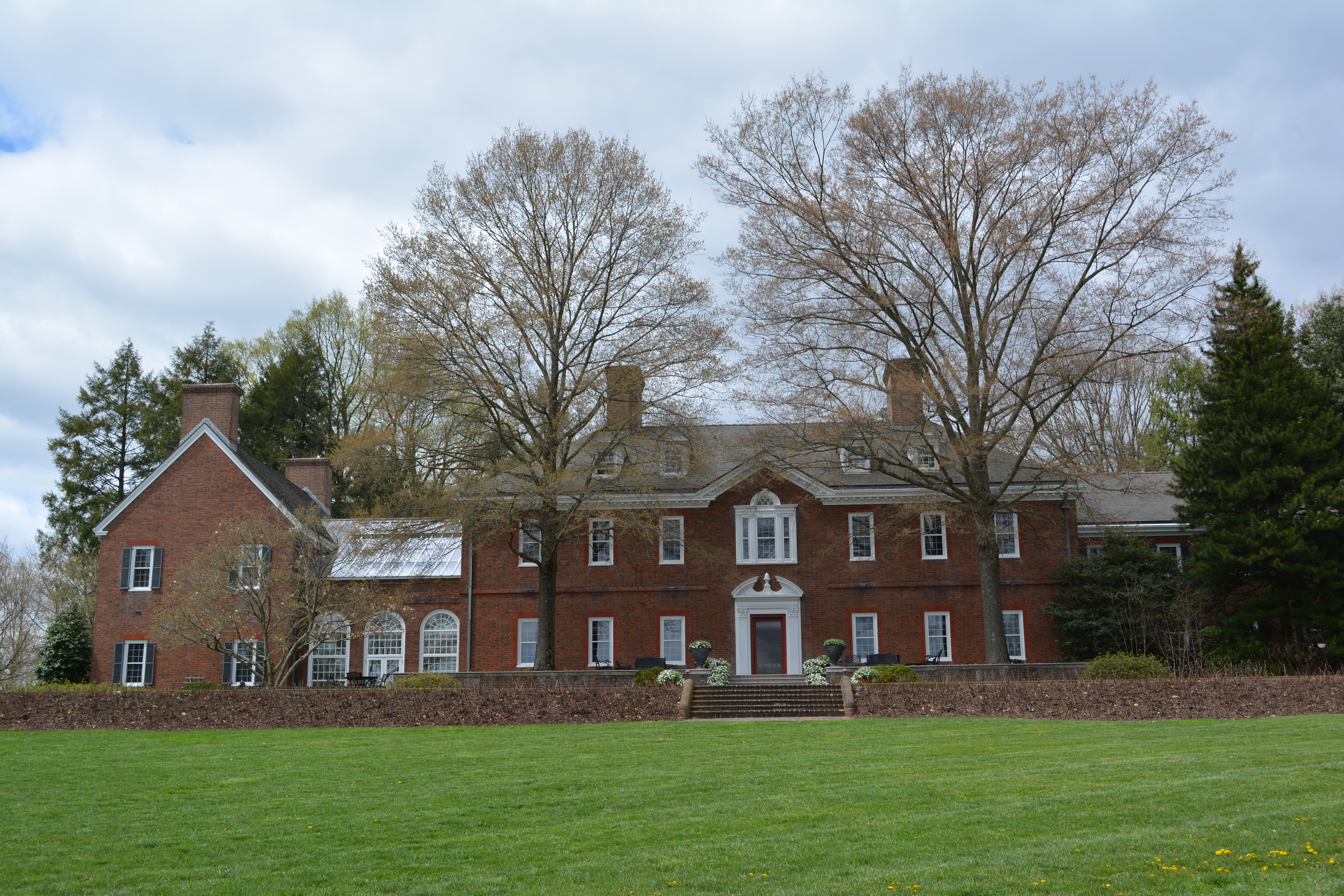
The Copelands' former mansion

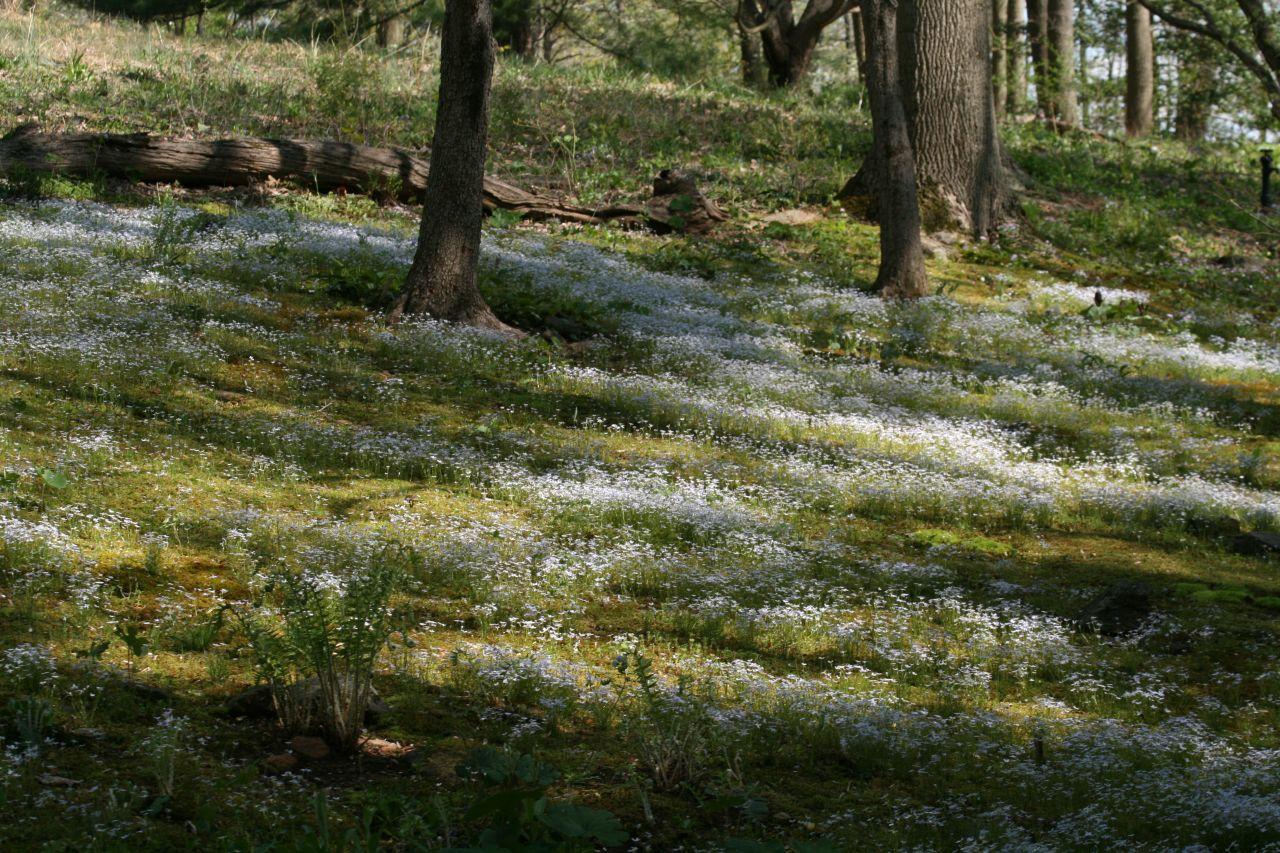
Near the dogwood path, Mt. Cuba Center

Mt. Cuba Center is the former home and family estate of Lammot du Pont Copeland and his wife, Pamela Cunningham Copeland. In 1935, the Copelands built a stately Colonial Revival manor house near the village of Mt. Cuba, outside of Wilmington, Delaware. The Copelands were prominent members of the community. Mr. Copeland served as President and Chairman of the DuPont Company, while Mrs. Copeland was a leader in many community and cultural organizations. During the late 1930s, formal areas were designed first by the prominent Philadelphia landscape architect Thomas W. Sears and later, in the 1950s, by noted landscape designer Marian Cruger Coffin.^{[2]}

In the 1960s, the Copelands were becoming acutely aware of a changing land ethic and they became more interested in ecology and the need for conservation. Mrs. Copeland, in particular, was increasingly concerned about wildflowers and the impact on them by development and unscrupulous practices. In response, landscape architect Seth Kelsey was hired to develop the woodland wildflower gardens with native plants, design their ponds, and plan many woodland garden paths.

In 1983, Dr. Richard Lighty was hired by the Copelands as their first Director of Horticulture. The Copelands expanded their horticultural endeavors to study native plants of the Appalachian Piedmont, the beginnings of a botanic garden on a private estate. That same year, Mr. Copeland passed away. In the late 1980s, Mt. Cuba Center began hosting visitors by offering docent-led tours during the spring. Mt. Cuba Center horticulturists also began documenting their increasingly diverse native plant collections.

In 2001, Mrs. Copeland died. Mt. Cuba Center was no longer a botanic garden on a private estate but a public garden for all to be inspired about native plants. It was added to the National Register of Historic Places in 2003.

Continuing education classes started in 2006. In 2013, Mt. Cuba Center launched general admission during the spring, summer, and fall seasons.

== Gardens ==
Mt. Cuba's well-documented plant collection is focused on the study of eastern North American flora, with emphasis on the Appalachian Piedmont. The collections hold over 6,500 accessions. Horticultural research focuses on Coreopsis, Heuchera, Baptisia, and Trillium. Mt. Cuba Center is a "national collection" holder for Asarum and Trillium. Several of its introductions are widely popular, including Aster laevis 'Bluebird', Aster novae-angliae 'Purple Dome' and Solidago sphacelata 'Golden Fleece'.

The Center encompasses a diverse set of grounds, ranging from a Lilac Alleé, Formal Garden, and South Terrace to more natural gardens including the Dogwood Path, Meadow, Pond Garden, West Slope Path, Woods Path and Rock Wall.

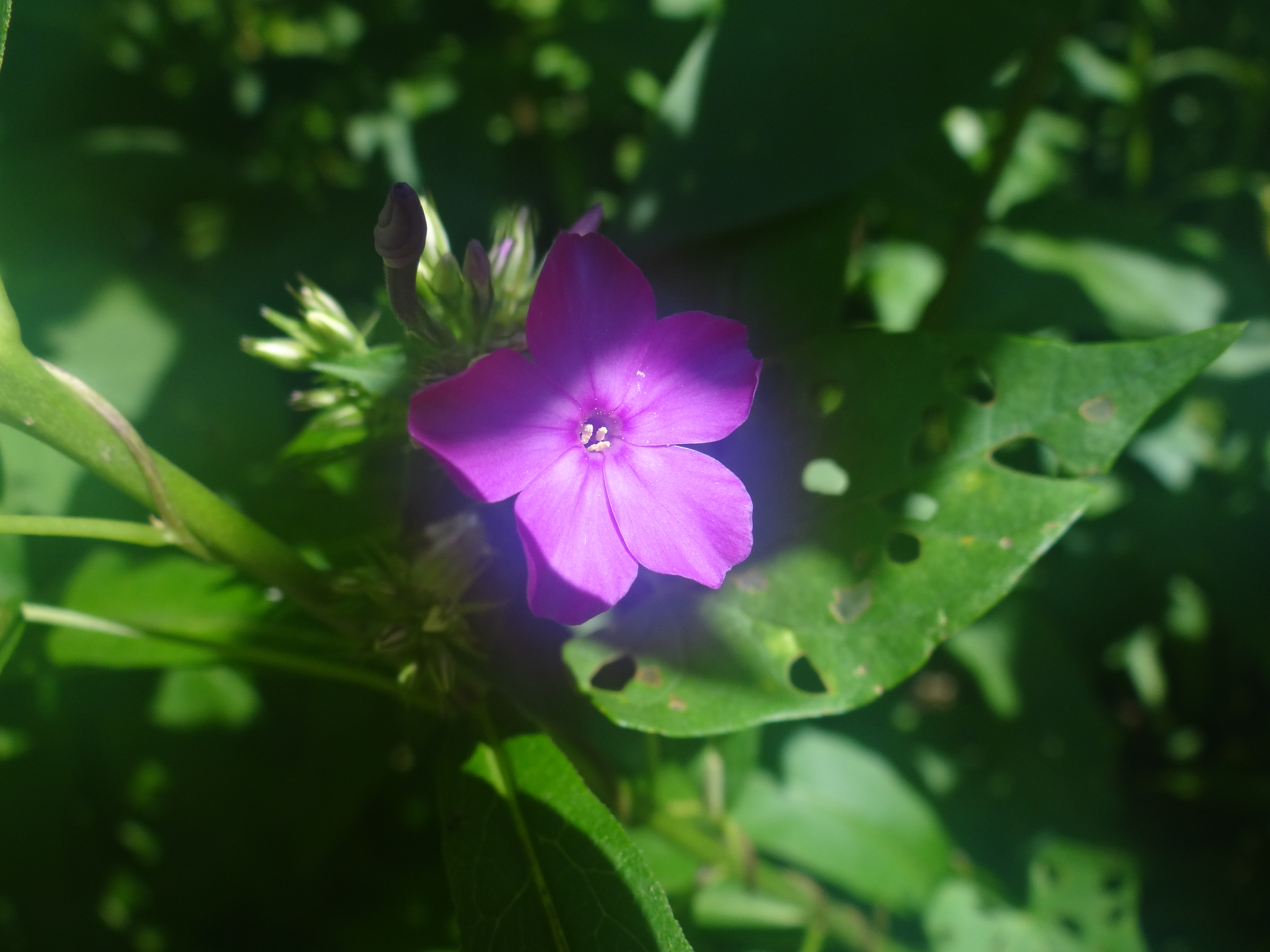

The 6,500 accessions of plants in the collection represent more than 2,200 taxa on a diverse set of grounds, ranging from formal to naturalistic gardens. Garden areas include native plant meadows, woodland and pond gardens and historic non-native plantings such as a lilac alleé. A prominent trial garden has focused Horticultural research on the genera Coreopsis, Heuchera, Baptisia, Monarda and Trillium and several of its introductions are widely popular, including Aster laevis 'Bluebird', Aster novae-angliae 'Purple Dome' and Solidago sphacelata 'Golden Fleece'. Mt. Cuba Center is an American Public Gardens Association Plant Collections Network holder for Asarum and Trillium.

Mt. Cuba Center's over 500 acres of Natural Lands surround the gardens and managed landscapes and consist of steeply rolling hills, stream valleys, rock outcrops, and deciduous forests. Mt. Cuba Center focuses on restoration and conservation in its Natural Lands, which are available to the public through educational programs and through science-based research projects and collaborations.

A 2020 reader's choice poll voted the Mt. Cuba Center the best botanical garden in the United States.

== Education ==
Mt. Cuba Center offers continuing education classes in horticulture, conservation, art and wellness. Participants have the option of following educational tracks leading towards a certificate in ecological gardening, which emphasizes the importance of gardening in the context of a greater ecosystem. Mt. Cuba also offers a 12-week summer internship program and a fellowship supporting field research.

== See also ==
- List of botanical gardens in the United States
- North American Plant Collections Consortium
