= Victorine & Samuel Homsey =

American architectural firm

Practice information
- Partners: Victorine du Pont Homsey; Samuel Eldon Homsey
- Founded: 1935
- Dissolved: 1979
- Location: Wilmington, Delaware

Victorine & Samuel Homsey was an American architectural firm centered in Delaware and founded by the architects Victorine du Pont Homsey (1900–1998) and Samuel Eldon Homsey (1904–1994). It was one of the first architectural firms in the United States founded by married partners.

== Background on partners ==
Victorine du Pont was born November 27, 1900, in Grosse Pointe, Michigan, to Antoine Biderman (or Bidermann) du Pont, Jr., and Mary Ethel (Clark) du Pont. The Du Ponts were an old and well-to-do family; her great-grandfather was the industrialist Alfred V. du Pont. She attended Wellesley College, where she earned her undergraduate degree in 1923. She went on to get her certificate in architecture in 1925 from the Cambridge School of Domestic and Landscape Architecture for Women (which was not yet a degree-granting institution); ten years later, after the school became affiliated with Smith College, she was awarded the M. Arch degree.

After leaving the Cambridge School, she worked as a draftsperson at the firm of Allen and Collens in Boston (1926–27), and there she met Samuel Homsey, whom she married in 1929. In 1928–29, she moved to another Boston firm, P. Patterson Smith, where she also worked as a draftsperson.

Samuel Eldon Homsey was born August 29, 1904, in Boston, Massachusetts, to Elias S. and Margaret (Sabbag) Homsey. He earned both his B.S. and his M.S. Arch degrees from the Massachusetts Institute of Technology, graduating with his master's degree in 1926. He later studied painting informally and painted landscapes in watercolor, several of which are in the collection of the Biggs Museum of American Art.

== Architectural practice ==
Victorine and Samuel moved to Wilmington, Delaware, and in 1935 opened a firm known as Victorine & Samuel Homsey (later Victorine & Samuel Homsey, Inc.). They are thought to have been the first Delaware architects to work in the International Style, and one of their early house designs was chosen by New York's Museum of Modern Art to represent International Style in a 1938 Paris exhibition. In general, however, their style was more eclectic, and in part because they began their careers during the Great Depression, they felt it was important for architects to work on developing ways to work economically and with new materials. In 1950, one of their house designs for small sites was included in a "Five-Star" series developed by Better Homes and Gardens magazines, the working drawings and specifications for which could be bought by mail for $5.

The firm of Victorine & Samuel Homsey is considered one of Wilmington's most influential architectural practices of the mid 20th century, designing residences, schools, churches, and other buildings. Some of the team's commissions came from Du Pont-sponsored institutions such as Longwood Gardens and the Winterthur Museum, for which they designed the visitor's pavilion, lecture hall, and an office block. Other notable commissions include the Delaware Art Museum (1955) and a later expansion thereto; the American Embassy in Tehran, Iran (1964); the Cambridge Yacht Club in Maryland, which won a design award from the Maryland Association of Architects; and the Dover Public Library. A 1938 Colonial Revival–style house that they built has since been placed on the National Register of Historic Places and today serves as the administrative building for Mt. Cuba Center, a historical preserve and botanical garden not far from Wilmington.

Victorine was also in demand as a landscape architect and designed a number of Delaware gardens. She was elected a Fellow of the American Institute of Architects (AIA) in 1967. She held a number of appointments in her field, including serving on the Washington Fine Arts Commission and the advisory board of the Historic American Buildings Survey; and she chaired the Restoration Committee for the Octagon House, the AIA's headquarters in Washington, D.C.

During World War II, they moved to Washington, D.C., where Samuel served in the Naval Reserve for four years as a commander in the office of research and inventions. During the war, Victorine partnered with architect Eugene H. Klaber to design an elementary school and a large federal public housing development in Greenbelt, Maryland.

Samuel was a Fellow of the AIA and also held the post of vice-president for two years (1965–67). He served on a number of different Delaware zoning commissions and planning boards.

Both Homseys retired in 1979; they turned the firm over to the younger of their two sons, the architect Eldon du Pont Homsey, and it became known as Homsey Architects, Inc.

Samuel died in 1994 on May 22, 1994, and Victorine died four years later on January 6, 1998. Records of their practice from 1937 on are held by the Hagley Museum and Library in Wilmington.
