= United States Senate Lobby Investigation Committee =

Dissolved US senate investigation committee

The Senate Lobby Investigation Committee was a special committee that once operated within the United States Senate during the 1930s and 1940s to investigate lobbyists. The committee was chaired by Hugo Black, and upon his appointment to the United States Supreme Court, it was chaired by Sherman Minton.

According to professor of political science Linda C. Gugin, a Minton biographer, in practice, the committee's investigations were politically motivated and directed against groups challenging the New Deal.

== Black chairmanship ==
The committee's investigations made national news headlines several times, the first in mid-1935, as the committee launched a major probe into utility companies funding opposition to the Wheeler-Rayburn Act, a utility regulation bill pending before Congress. The committee alleged that the nation's major utility companies were conspiring to defeat the bill and ordered Western Union to turn over all telegrams sent on behalf of the company for the committee to investigate. After weeks of wrangling, which included the issuance of subpoenas and court injunctions, the committee obtained the telegrams and discovered that the utilities had spent over one million dollars to lobby for the bill's defeat. They also found money had been spent to send over five million fake letters and telegrams to senators, supposedly from concerned citizens, opposing the bill. The Wheeler-Rayburn bill passed shortly after the debacle, which quickly led to the collapse and the breakup of the nation's three largest utility companies.

In 1936, the committee went a step further to prove that the same companies had improperly influenced Republicans in Congress. Critics of Black's lobbying committee in leading newspapers, such as the Washington Post and Chicago Tribune, described his investigative methods as both “inquisitorial” and “terroristic” and charged that his goal was to intimidate and silence anti-New Dealers. Most controversially, Black, with the full backing of the Roosevelt administration, persuaded the FCC to order Western Union and other telegraph companies to provide access to copies to several million telegrams sent during the period of February 1 to September 1, 1935. Committee and FCC staffers examined the telegrams at the rate of several thousand per day. The committee's goal was to uncover content that had bearing on lobbying, which it defined very broadly to include just about any political commentary. People who had their private telegrams examined included every member of Congress as well as leaders of anti-New Deal organizations including the major Chicago law firm Winston, Strawn & Shaw.

The firm launched legal action against the committee, claiming their Fourth Amendment Rights had been violated. They won their case in court and ended the committee's ability to issue mass subpoenas. William Randolph Hearst, a prominent and wealthy media magnate, began attacking the committee though his newspapers because of what he called their "reckless attacks on freedom." Minton led the effort to silence Hearst and delivered a speech attacking him for his support of the Republican Party.

The committee also uncovered previously unrevealed links between the Farmers Independence Council of America, a group believed to be a nonpartisan opponent of President Roosevelt's efforts to reform agriculture, and the American Liberty League, which strongly opposed the New Deal.

== Minton chairmanship ==
When Roosevelt appointed Senator Black secured to the Supreme Court in 1937, Minton became chair of the committee. He targeted the National Committee to Uphold Constitutional Government (NCUCG)., which had successfully fought Roosevelt's "court packing" plan. Minton accused the group, and its chief funder publisher Frank E. Gannett, of distributing misleading anti-FDR propaganda. He demanded that NCUCG disclose the names of contributors but Edward A. Rumely, the executive secretary, refused, on First Amendment grounds. Although Minton considered charging Rumely with contempt of Congress, John J. Abt, a special assistant to the Attorney General and a secret member of the Communist Party (an organization publicly opposed to Rumely), successfully recommended against it. Abt predicted that a jury conviction of Rumely for contempt was unlikely and that a trial might make him into an unintended civil liberties martyr.

Singling out what he regarded as unfair attacks on FDR by the Gannett and Hearst publications, the Chicago Daily Tribune, and the Philadelphia Inquirer Minton responded by introducing legislation to make it "illegal to publish information known to be false." Leading newspapers, including those owned by pro-New Deal publisher, J. David Stern, journalists, including Walter Lippmann, and politicians across the political spectrum charged that Minton was attacking the freedom of the press. Minton's allies in Congress asked him to withdraw the bill because of this groundswell of opposition and he dropped the matter.

With no chance that his bill would pass, Minton returned to his goal of exposing what he believed to be anti-Roosevelt control of the media. He led the committee to target a newspaper with national circulation, Rural Progress. The paper published anti-New Deal articles and had been operating at a financial loss for several years. Minton accused the publishers of improperly accepting large sums of money from corporations to influence its editors. The owner of the paper, Maurice V. Reynolds, was summoned before the committee for a hearing, and Minton demanded to know why he was accepting money from corporations. Reynolds had little day-to-day interaction with the paper and was unable to answer the committee's questions. When Reynolds asked his manager, Dr. Glenn Frank, who was also president of the University of Wisconsin, to help him answer the questions, Minton and his fellow Democratic senators began to shout him down. As Frank began to explain that the money from the corporations was for advertising in the magazine, Minton beat his gavel and yelled, "This committee doesn't intend to permit you to use this as a forum to air your Republican views."

Minton did not realize that Frank was president of the University of Wisconsin and soon suffered retaliation as a result of his mistreatment of Frank. Frank went on NBC radio stations around the country and granted interviews to papers, in which he lambasted Minton for his rudeness. He made lengthy arguments accusing Minton of attempting to violate the Bill of Rights. Minton was outraged by the attacks, which were beginning to have an effect among voters in Indiana. In 1938, he sought funding to launch a massive nationwide investigation of media conglomerates for proof of Republican interference in the press. Democratic Senator Edward R. Burke led an effort to defeat the measure and privately attacked Minton, accusing him of damaging the Democrats' cause, which led Minton to leave the Lobby Investigation Committee.
