= Georgetown Historic District =

Georgetown Historic District may refer to:

== United States ==
(by state)

- Georgetown-Silver Plume Historic District, Colorado, a United States National Historic Landmark
- Georgetown Historic District (Georgetown, Connecticut), in towns of Redding and Wilton, Connecticut, NRHP-listed
- Georgetown Historic District (Georgetown, Indiana)
- Georgetown Historic District (Georgetown, Ohio), NRHP-listed
- Georgetown Historic District (Georgetown, South Carolina), listed on the NRHP in Georgetown, South Carolina
- Georgetown, Washington, D.C., which includes Georgetown Historic District, NRHP-listed
