= John J. Raskob =

American businessman (1879–1950)

John Raskob
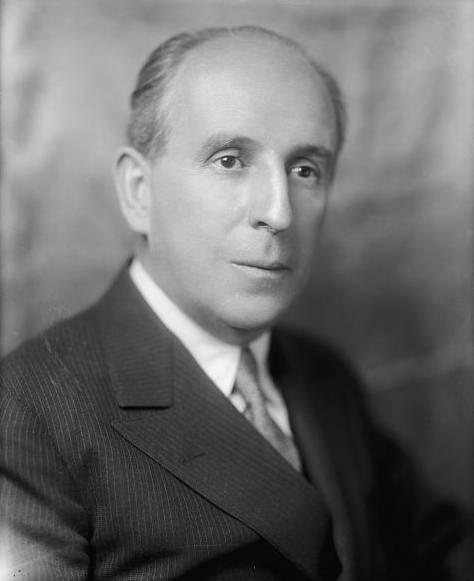

Chair of the Democratic National Committee
- In office July 11, 1928 – July 2, 1932
- Preceded by: Clem L. Shaver
- Succeeded by: James Farley

Personal details
- Born: John Jakob Raskob; March 19, 1879 Lockport, New York, U.S.
- Died: October 15, 1950 (aged 71) Centreville, Maryland, U.S.
- Party: Democratic
- Spouse: Helena Springer Green
- Children: 13

John Jakob Raskob, KCSG (March 19, 1879 – October 15, 1950) was a financial executive and businessman for DuPont and General Motors, and the builder of the Empire State Building. He was chairman of the Democratic National Committee from 1928 to 1932 and a key supporter of Alfred E. Smith's candidacy for President of the United States.

After Franklin D. Roosevelt became president, Raskob became a prominent opponent of the New Deal through his support of a number of anti-Roosevelt organizations such as the American Liberty League. Raskob was also a leader in the Association Against the Prohibition Amendment and a Treasurer for the Knights of Malta.

== Early life ==
Raskob was born to John (1850–1898) and Anna Frances (née Moran) Raskob (1851–1926), in Lockport, New York, where his father ran a successful cigar-production business. His parents were of German and Irish descent, respectively. The Raskob family originated in the Eifel region in Germany. Raskob's grandfather was an emigrant from the village of Großlittgen in the Eifel. During his studies at both parochial and public schools, Raskob delivered newspapers, worked in seasonal agriculture, participated in local theater and was involved in the Catholic community.

He entered a local business school after his high school graduation but dropped out to support his family through secretarial work following his father's death in 1898.

== Career ==
=== DuPont and General Motors ===
Raskob was hired in 1901 by Pierre S. du Pont as a personal secretary. In 1911, he became assistant treasurer of DuPont, in 1914 treasurer, and in 1918 president for finance of both DuPont and General Motors. Raskob had been an early investor in General Motors and had engineered DuPont's ownership of 43% of GM, purchased from the financially troubled William C. Durant.

While with GM, he led the creation of GMAC (now Ally Financial), the company that allowed GM dealers to offer installment credit directly to customers. He also promoted the use of standard financial statistics to measure the performance of different operations within a diversified company, primarily through his associate Donaldson Brown.

Raskob held the head financial job at both GM and DuPont until 1928, when he resigned from GM in a dispute with chairman Alfred P. Sloan.

=== "Everybody Ought to be Rich" ===
In the 1920s, Raskob was a big proponent of investing in stocks. He gave an interview to Samuel Crowther for Ladies Home Journal in which he suggested every American could become wealthy by investing $15 per month in common stocks, at a time when the average American's weekly salary was between $17 and $22. The article, titled "Everybody Ought to be Rich", was published just two months before the Wall Street crash of 1929.

=== Political activity ===
Raskob had supported Democratic presidential candidate Al Smith in the 1928 election, and Smith invited Raskob to become chairman of the Democratic National Committee. Sloan, a supporter of Herbert Hoover, insisted Raskob resign either from GM or the DNC. Raskob left GM after the board supported Sloan, sold his GM stock, and used the proceeds to build the Empire State Building.

Raskob made Smith president of the Empire State Co., operators of the building, based on a promise to do business together the night Smith lost the presidential election. Raskob served as chairman of the DNC through 1932. He continued to promote Smith's candidacy as Chairman of the DNC, and to advocate for the adoption of an anti-prohibition policy. Both of these positions were opposed by different factions within the Democratic Party.

In 1932, when Franklin D. Roosevelt (who was by then on rather bad terms with Al Smith) won the party's nomination and the election, Raskob (a Smith ally) resigned as DNC chairman. Raskob (like Al Smith) viewed many of Roosevelt's New Deal policies as radical and unhelpful to economic recovery.

Toward the end of Roosevelt's first term as president, Raskob began actively working against Roosevelt. Testimony given to the United States Senate Lobby Investigation Committee revealed Raskob was an active fundraiser for Georgia governor Eugene Talmadge, considered a possible anti-Roosevelt candidate for the Democratic nomination in the 1936 United States presidential election. Raskob later became involved with the American Liberty League, an anti-New Deal organization active around the time of the 1936 election.

=== Empire State Building ===
During the Great Depression, Raskob's business interests were focused on the Empire State Building, which was in competition with the Chrysler Building to become the world's tallest building. According to one story, Raskob had taken a jumbo pencil, stood it on end and asked architect William F. Lamb, "Bill, how high can you make it so that it won't fall down?"

During the early years of the Depression, the Empire State Building had so few tenants it was mocked as the "Empty State Building". Raskob was also invested in precious metal mining in Nevada and New Mexico, ranching, the aeronautical industry and pesticides. Raskob remained with DuPont until his retirement from the company in 1946.

== Philanthropy ==
Raskob's religious convictions motivated him to be substantially involved in charitable giving over the course of his life. He provided the initial funding for the Catholic Foundation for the Diocese of Wilmington, and established several other foundations, including one which funds grants for projects and programs associated with the Catholic Church, and another which provides no-interest educational loans. In 1921, he was appointed a Knight of St. Gregory by Pope Pius XI, recognizing him for his contributions. He also served as a Treasurer in the Knights of Malta.

The philanthropic Raskob Foundation for Catholic Activities continues to be operated by Raskob's descendants and provides grants to Catholic institutions to this day.

== Personal life ==
Raskob married Helena Springer Green in 1906, and they had 13 children. One son, William, predeceased him in an automobile crash at the age of 20, and the Bill Raskob Foundation was started in memory of him. Raskob is known in the Claymont and Wilmington areas for building the "Patio" at what is now Archmere Academy between 1916 and 1918. Originally his residence, it features a marble fountain which has each of his 13 children sculpted around the side.

Raskob's former home at Pioneer Point on the Eastern Shore of Maryland was bought by the Soviet government in 1972, and the 19-room mansion, once known as "Hartefeld Hall", was used as a retreat or dacha by Russian diplomats until Barack Obama ordered it and another Russian property on Long Island seized by the US State Department under authority of the Foreign Missions Act in response to Russian interference in the 2016 US presidential election.

On May 31, 2017, The Washington Post reported that President Donald Trump and his administration had decided to return Pioneer Point to the Russians, however, as of May, 2018, it had still not been returned.

Party political offices
Preceded by Clem L. Shaver	Chair of the Democratic National Committee; 1928–1932	Succeeded by James Farley
