= Georgetown Historic District (Georgetown, Indiana) =

Historic district in Indiana, United States

- U.S. National Register of Historic Places
- U.S. Historic district
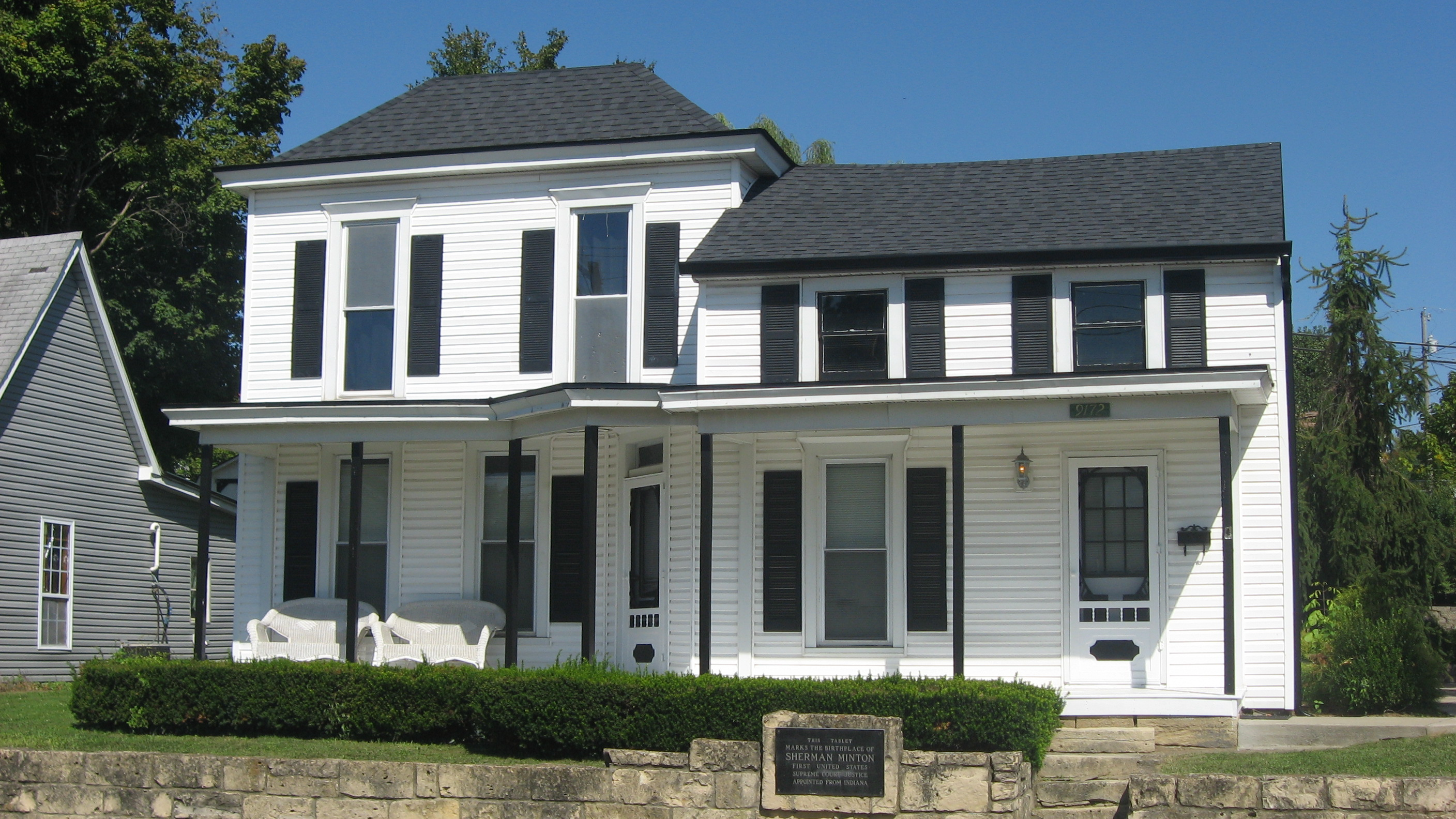
- Sherman Minton Birthplace, September 2012

- Location within Indiana Location within the United States
- Location: Roughly bounded by Georgetown-Greenville Rd., Canal Ln., Walnut St., and an unnamed alley, Georgetown, Indiana
- Coordinates: 38°17′40″N 85°58′30″W
- Area: 52 acres (21 ha)
- Built: 1835
- Architectural style: Greek Revival, Italianate, Classical Revival, Bungalow/craftsman, Ranch
- NRHP reference No.: 12001148
- Added to NRHP: January 9, 2013

The Georgetown Historic District is a national historic district located in Georgetown, Floyd County, Indiana. The district includes 163 contributing buildings, one contributing site, and three contributing structures in the central business district and surrounding residential sections of Georgetown.

It developed between about 1835 and the 1950s, and includes notable examples of Greek Revival, Italianate, Classical Revival, Bungalow / American Craftsman, and Ranch style architecture. Notable buildings include the Georgetown Township Consolidated School (1925), Georgetown Firehouse (c. 1940), Wolfe Hotel (1835), Georgetown Bank (1909), First United Brethren Church (1843), Sherman Minton Birthplace (1858), and George R. Fox Saloon (c. 1910).

It was listed on the National Register of Historic Places in 2013.
