= 1934 United States Senate election in Indiana =

- November 6, 1934
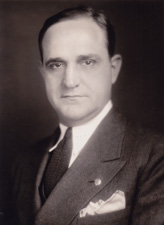

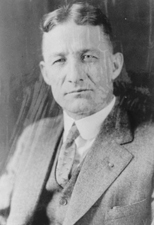
Nominee	Sherman Minton	Arthur Robinson
Party	Democratic	Republican
Popular vote	758,801	700,103
Percentage	51.46%	47.48%
- County results Minton: 40–50% 50–60% 60–70% Robinson: 40–50% 50–60%
U.S. senator before election
Arthur Raymond Robinson
Republican
Elected U.S. Senator
Sherman Minton
Democratic

The 1934 United States Senate election in Indiana took place on November 6, 1934. Incumbent Republican U.S. Senator Arthur Robinson ran for re-election to a second term, but lost narrowly to Democrat Sherman Minton.

== General election ==
=== Candidates ===
- Albert W. Jackman (Prohibition)
- Sherman Minton, Indiana Utility Commissioner (Democratic)
- Arthur Raymond Robinson, incumbent Senator since 1925 (Republican)
- Wenzel Stocker (Communist)
- Forrest Wallace (Socialist)

=== Results ===
1934 U.S. Senate election in Indiana
Party	Candidate	Votes	%	±%
Democratic	Sherman Minton	758,801	51.46%	▲7.34
Republican	Arthur Raymond Robinson (incumbent)	700,103	47.48%	▼7.82
Socialist	Forrest Wallace	9,414	0.64%	▲0.40
Prohibition	Albert W. Jackman	4,987	0.34%	▲0.05
Communist	Wenzel Stocker	1,307	0.09%	▲0.07
Total votes		1,473,305	100.00%	
Democratic gain from Republican				

== See also ==
- 1934 United States Senate elections
