= Farmers Independence Council of America =

The Farmers Independence Council of America was an American political organization formed in the 1930s to oppose President Franklin Delano Roosevelt's effort to reform American agriculture through the Agricultural Adjustment Act during the Great Depression. Originally considered a nonpartisan organization, testimony in front of the United States Senate Lobby Investigation Committee revealed the council had close ties with the American Liberty League and Republican Party.
