= Clem L. Shaver =

American politician

Clem Shaver
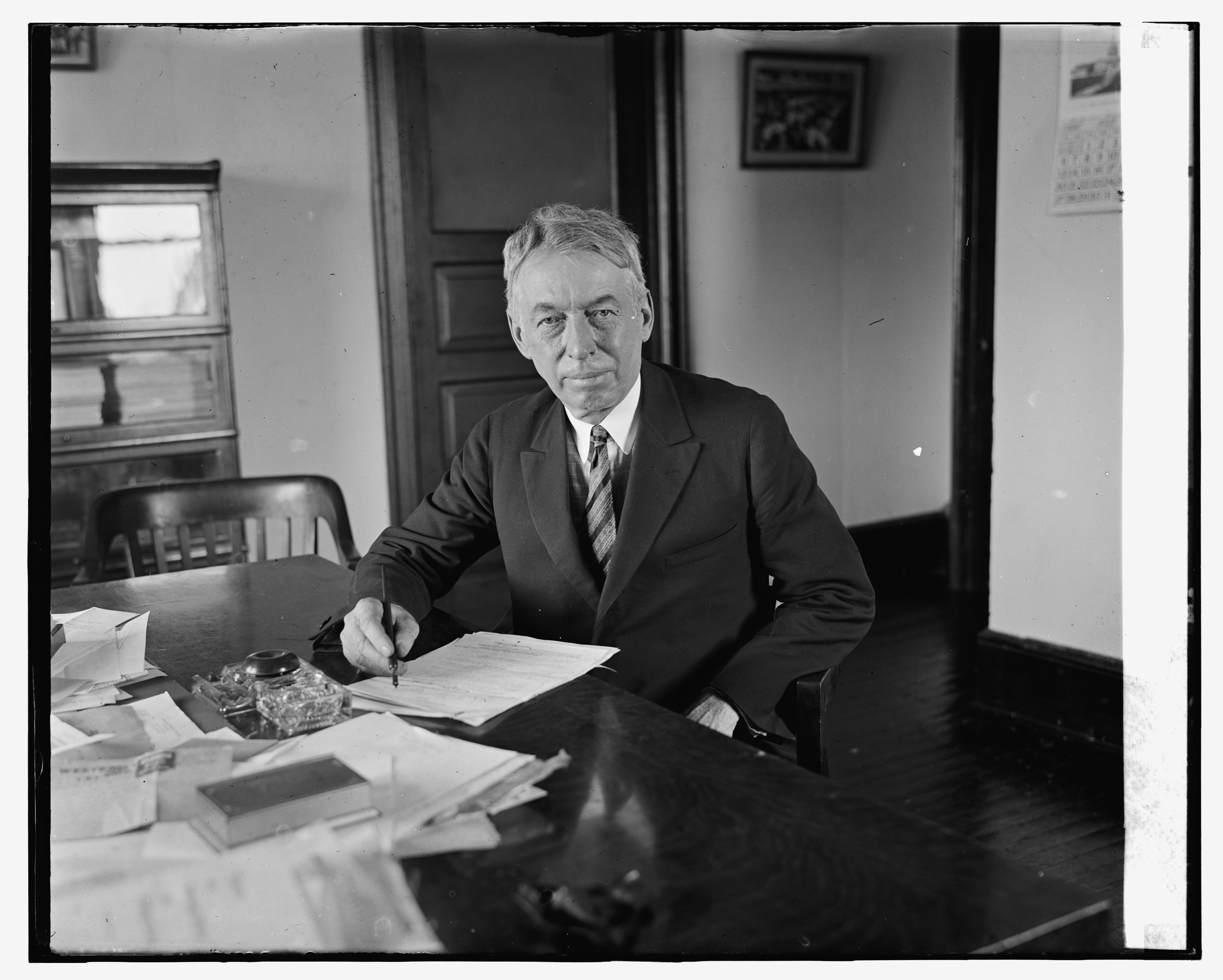

Chair of the Democratic National Committee
- In office July 22, 1924 – July 11, 1928
- Preceded by: Cordell Hull
- Succeeded by: John J. Raskob

Personal details
- Born: Clement Lawrence Shaver; January 22, 1867 Marion County, West Virginia, U.S.
- Died: September 1, 1954 (aged 87) Mannington, West Virginia, U.S.
- Party: Democratic
- Education: Fairmont State University (BA); George Washington University (LLB)

Clement Lawrence Shaver (January 22, 1867 – September 1, 1954) was a West Virginia politician who was the Democratic National Committee Chairman from 1924 to 1928.

== Early life ==
He was born in Marion County, West Virginia, on January 22, 1867, the son of John Riffle Shaver (1841–1909) and Sarah Cordelia Shaver (née Cunningham, 1844–1932).

== Career ==
He was the West Virginia Democratic state chair from 1913 to 1916 and from 1916 to 1920. In 1934 he was an unsuccessful candidate for the United States Senate.

Shaver died on September 1, 1954.

Party political offices
Preceded by Cordell Hull	Chair of the Democratic National Committee; 1924–1928	Succeeded by John J. Raskob
