= Yenowine-Nichols-Collins House =

Historic house in Indiana, United States

- Formerly listed on the U.S. National Register of Historic Places
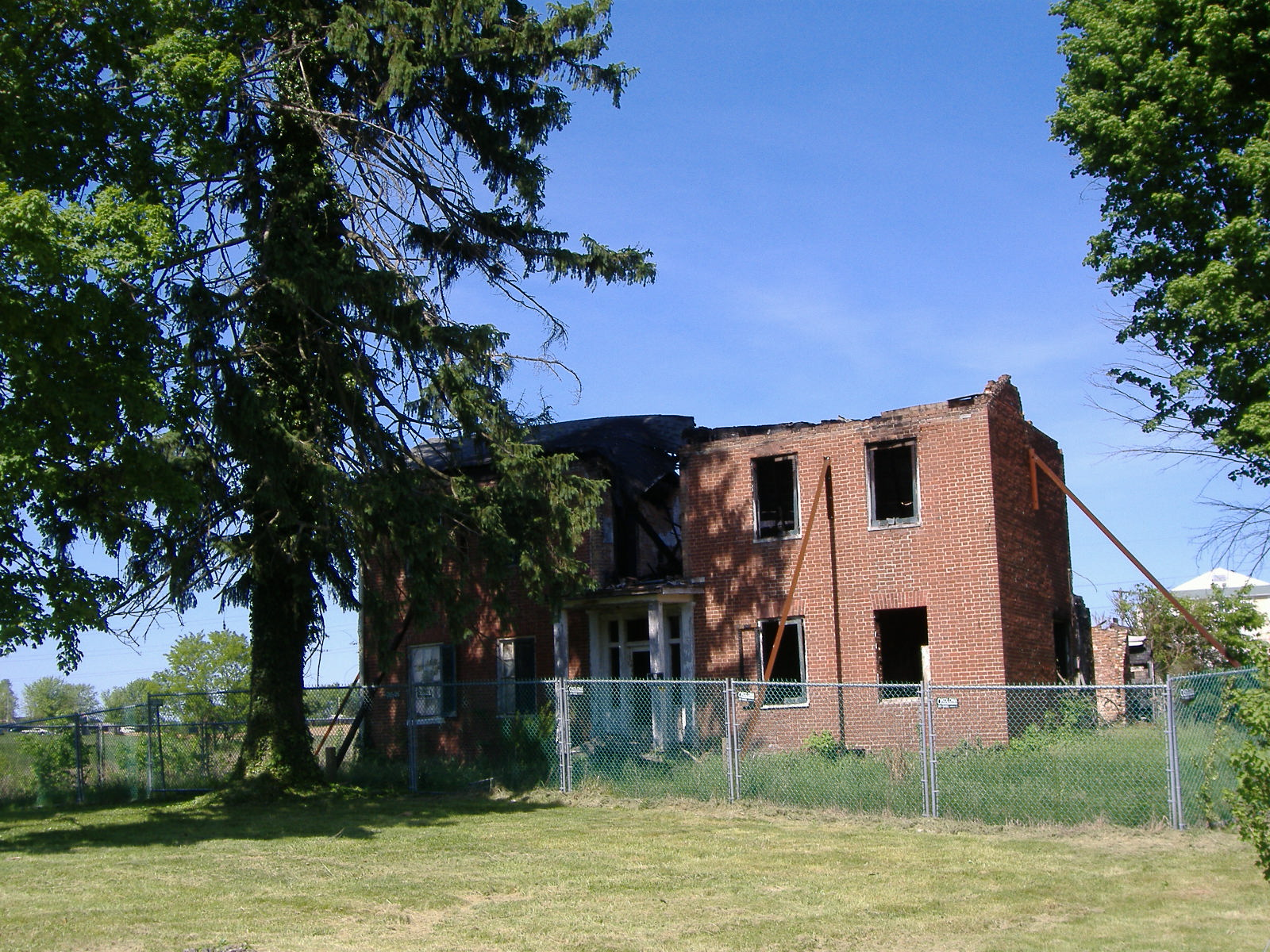
- Location: Georgetown, Indiana
- Coordinates: 38°17′25.91″N 85°54′58.4″W
- Area: 3 acres (1.2 ha)
- Built: 1832
- Architect: Yenowine family
- Architectural style: Greek Revival, Federal
- NRHP reference No.: 75000017

Significant dates
- Added to NRHP: May 12, 1975
- Removed from NRHP: March 6, 2008

The Yenowine-Nichols-Collins House was once on the National Register of Historic Places in Georgetown, Indiana. A fire took place on October 31, 2005, due to Halloween arson, and the building was torn down in 2008. Later that year, First Harrison Bank rebuilt the structure in its original design. They used as many bricks from the original building as possible and now occupy the building as a bank branch. The house was built in 1832, and was a two-story, five-bay, Federal style brick dwelling. It had a rear ell, low gable roof, and gable end chimneys.

The last of the descendants of the builders, Mabelle Collins, in 1983 created a "preservation easement" that required that the house be kept in historical condition. This stopped the owners since 1994, Charles and Lynda Meyer, in their attempts to use or sell the building as they wished.

The Historic Landmarks Foundation of Indiana is helping with the recovery. This, after taking measures in 2004 to stop the moving of the building. HLFI offered $10,000 for the arrest of the arsonist, but the Meyers refused HLFI's demands that they add to the offer; the arson occurred two months after HLFI successfully sued the Meyers to use their own money to restore the house. At the time of the fire, the Meyers still had not done anything to restore the house, despite the ruling. The Meyers stated they want the House to be considered a total loss.

In December 2007, Historic Landmarks Foundation of Indiana announced that it had reached an agreement with First Harrison Bank that would guarantee the reconstruction of the Yenowine-Nichols-Collins House. The bank intended to purchase the structure (which was damaged beyond repair), salvage the bricks and other material and rebuild the home to its original appearance as part of a new bank branch.

On March 6, 2008, the House was removed from the National Register, as it had been torn down.

== Gallery ==
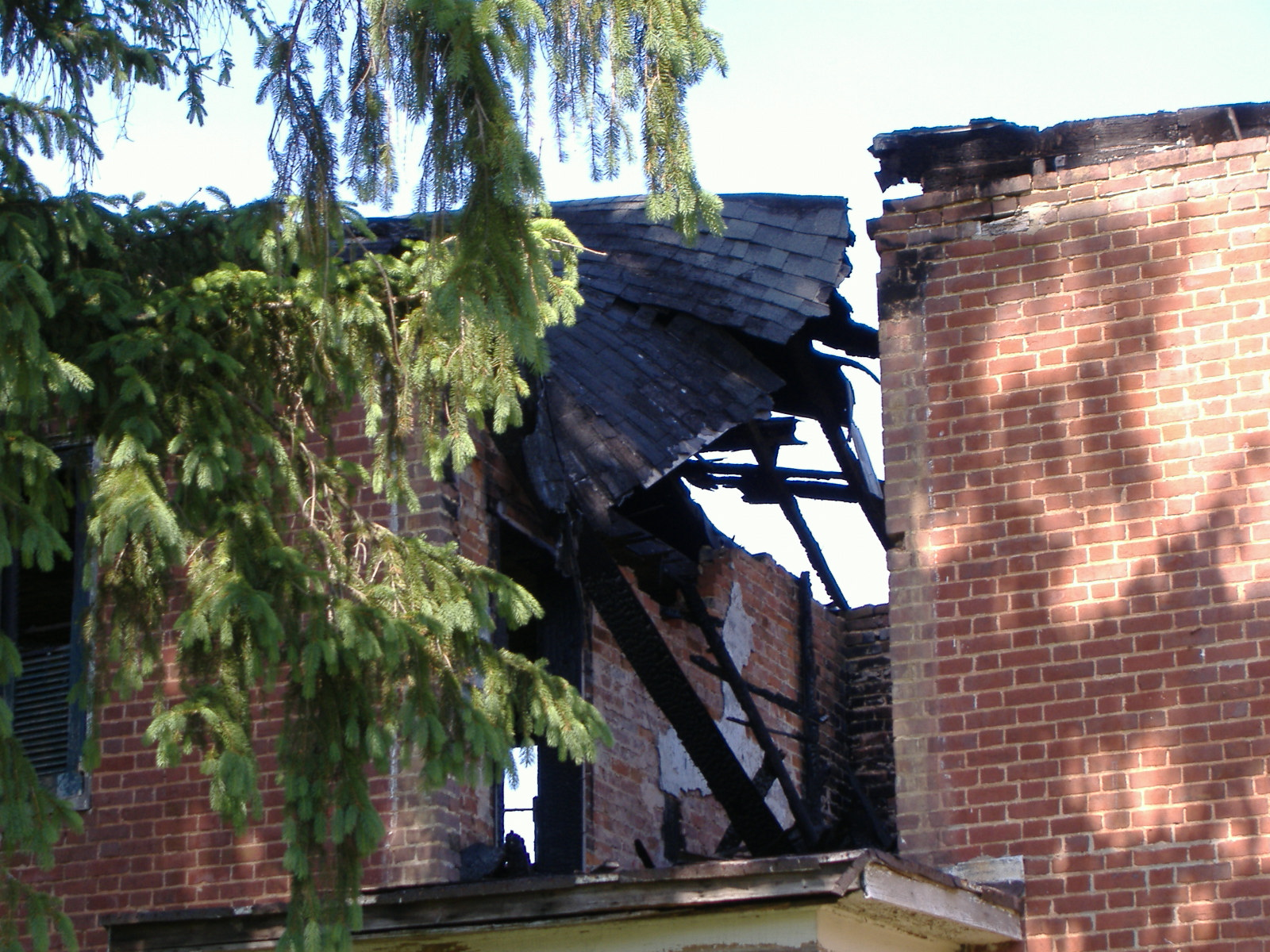
Closeup of the fire damage on the second floor

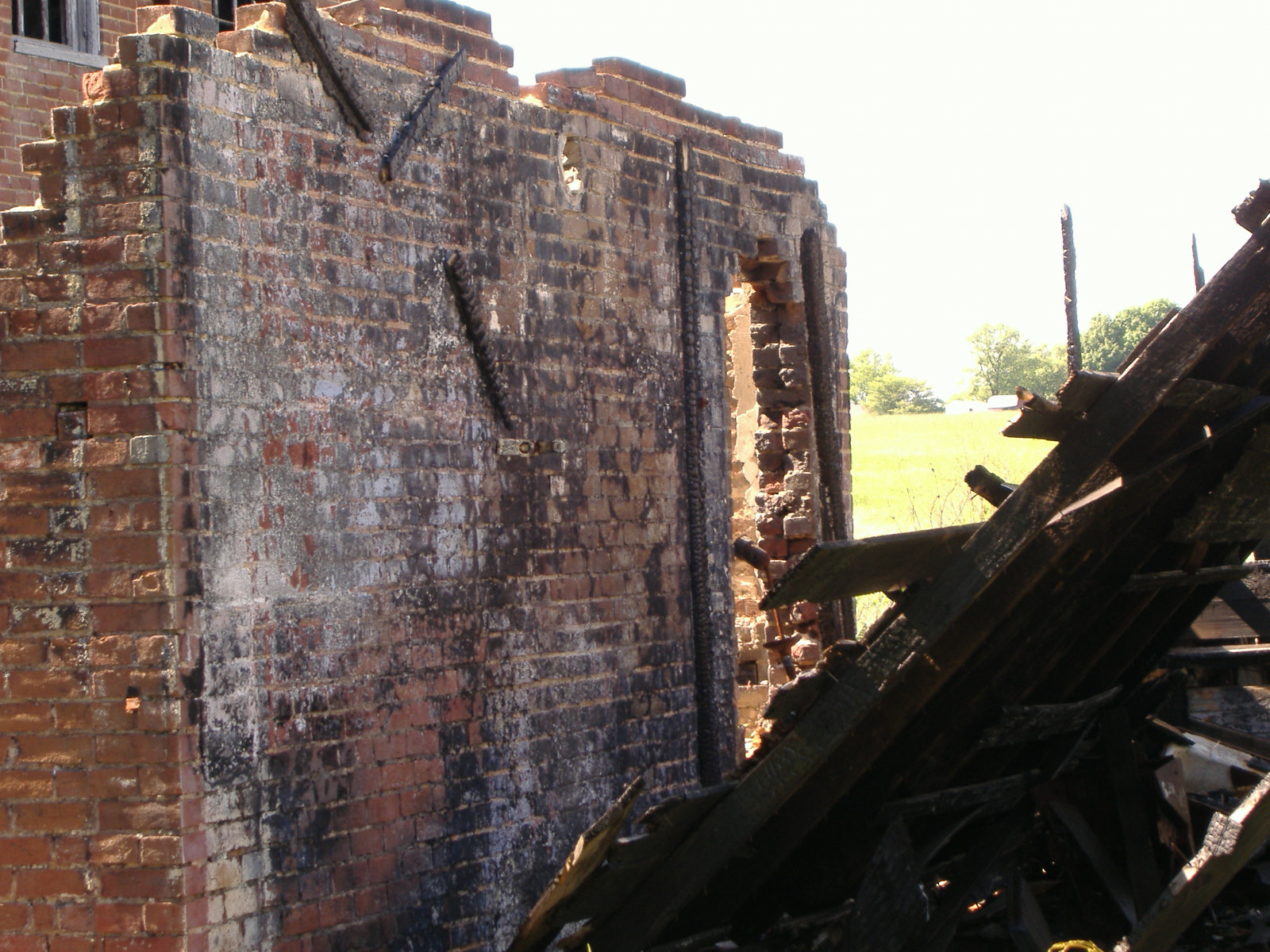
Closeup of the fire damage of the ground floor

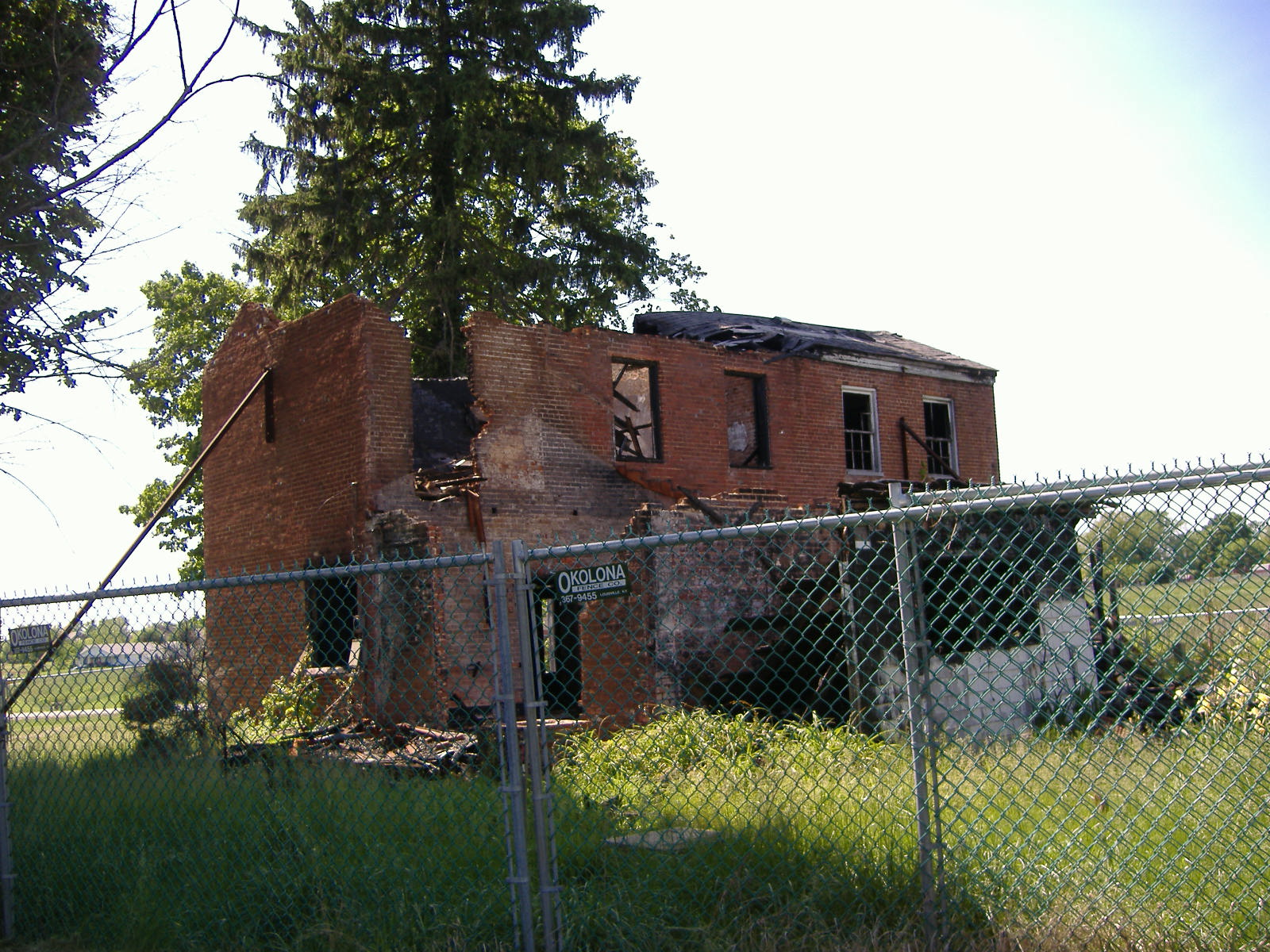
Backside of the house

== See also ==
- George B. Yenowine House (Middletown, KY)
- Yenowine-Kennedy House (Jeffersontown, KY)
