= Donaldson Brown =

American financial executive (1885–1965)

Frank Donaldson Brown (February 1, 1885 – October 2, 1965) was an American financial executive and corporate director with both DuPont and General Motors Corporation. He is the originator of DuPont analysis, a widely used technique in finance.

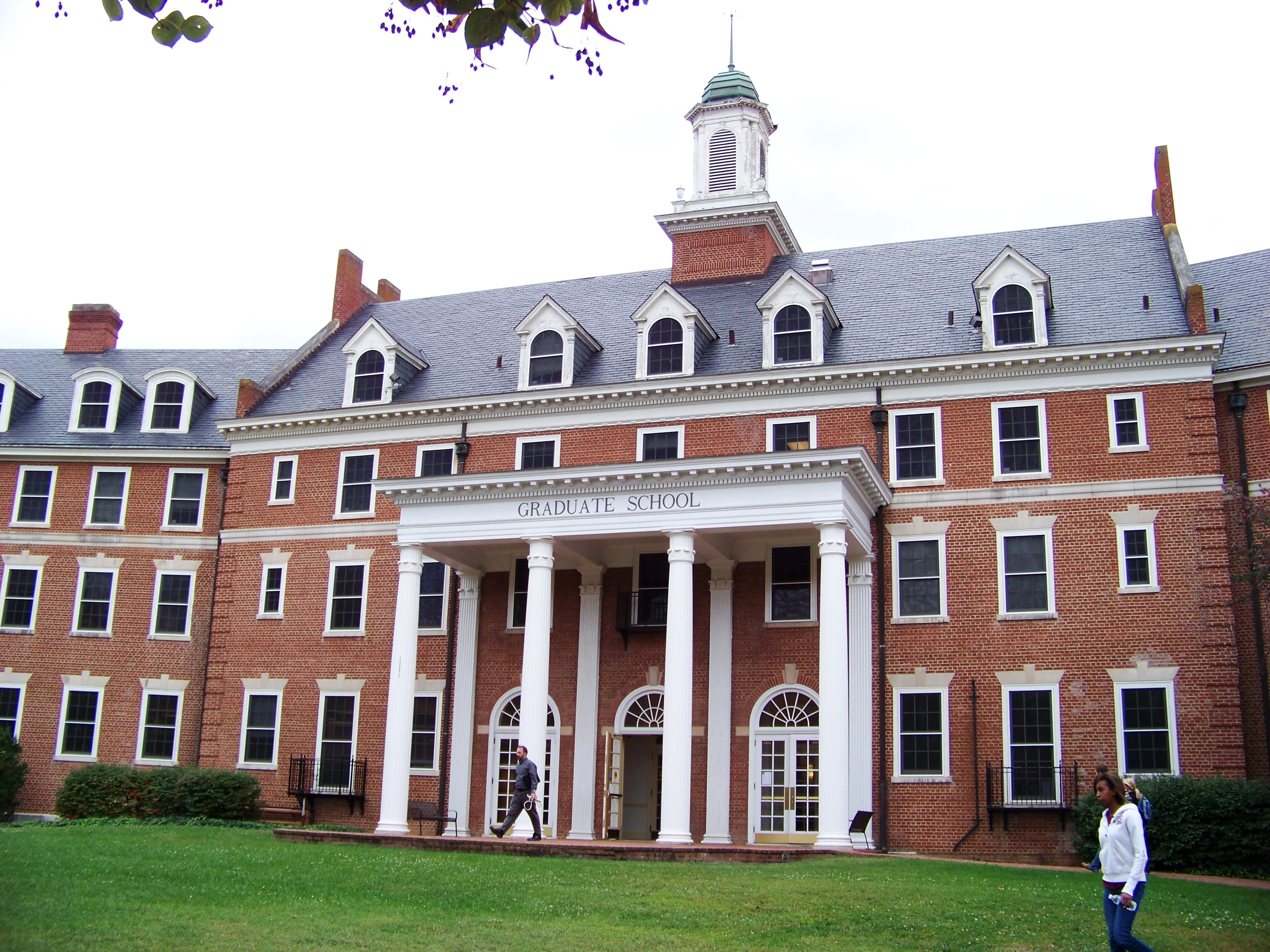
Graduate Life Center at Donaldson Brown

He graduated from Virginia Tech in 1902 with a Bachelor of Science degree in Electrical Engineering. He did graduate studies in engineering at Cornell University and joined DuPont in 1909 as an explosives salesman.

In 1912 he came to the attention of DuPont treasurer John J. Raskob, who brought him into the financial activity and encouraged him to use uniform accounting procedures and statistical formulas to evaluate the company's diverse business interests.

In 1918 he assisted in arranging DuPont's purchase of a substantial stake in General Motors from previous chairman William C. Durant, and later that year became treasurer of DuPont replacing Raskob. In 1921 he became treasurer of GM to help protect DuPont's investment in the struggling auto maker, and in 1924 he was appointed to the executive board of GM.

His introduction of standard financial ratios (return on investment and return on equity) and flexible budgeting allowed the company to effectively manage its decentralized empire. During this time he worked closely with legendary GM head Alfred P. Sloan. He was vice chairman of the board from 1937 to 1946.

Brown retired as an active executive with GM in 1946, but remained on the board until 1959 when he and 3 other directors had to resign due to interlocking directorships with DuPont.

== Graduate Life Center at Donaldson Brown ==
Brown was the chair of Virginia Tech's first alumni fund and was the largest single contributor to Virginia Tech's Continuing Education Center Building Fund. In 1968, the Donaldson Brown Center for Continuing Education was constructed on the Virginia Tech main campus. In 1995, the building became the Donaldson Brown Hotel and Conference Center, but following the completion of the Inn at Virginia Tech and Skelton Conference Center in 2006, the building was once again renamed the Graduate Life Center at Donaldson Brown. Donaldson Brown Hall currently houses Virginia Tech's graduate school and is a residence hall for approximately 115 graduate and professional students.

== Donaldson Brown Center ==
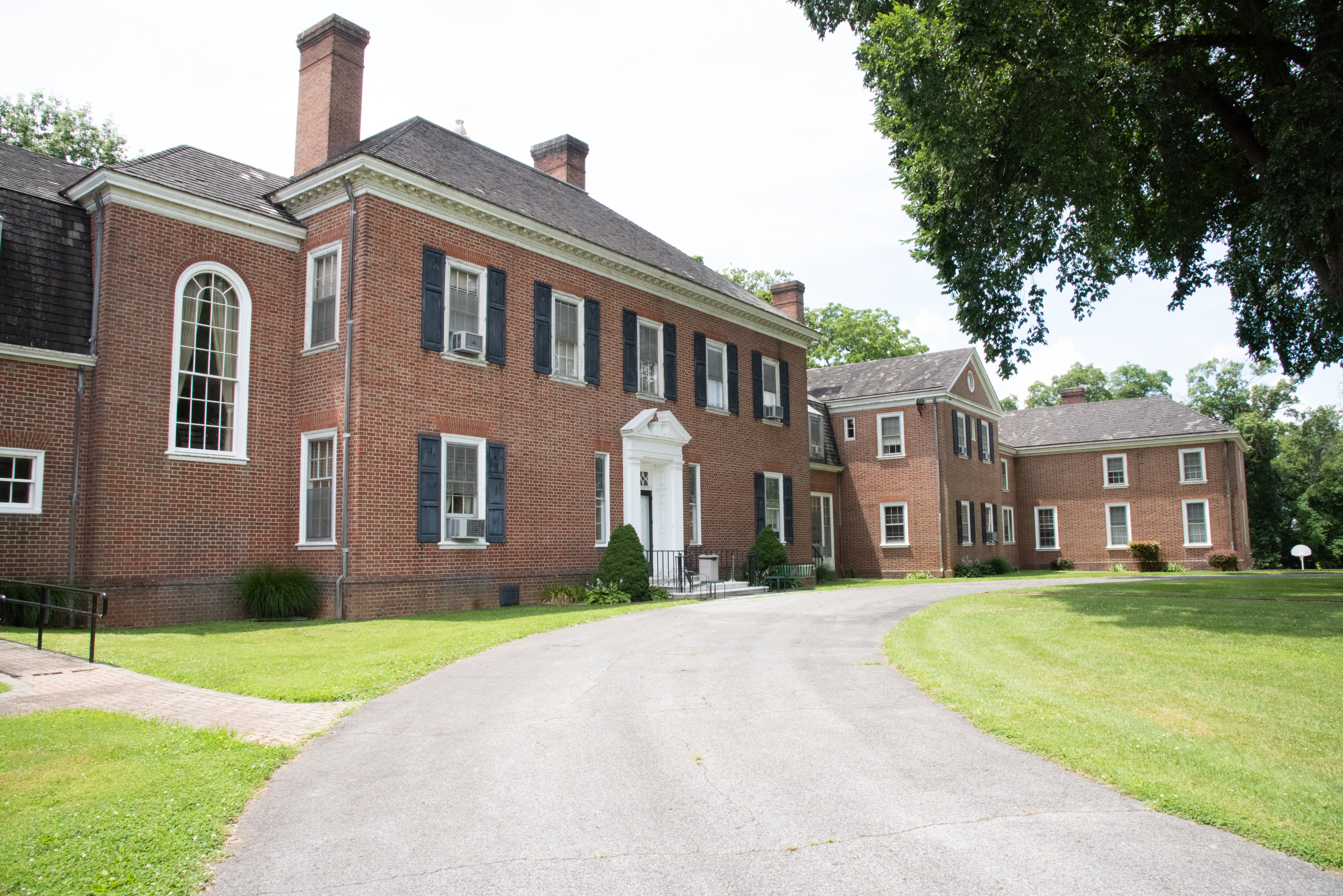
Donaldson Brown Center

In 1938, after a fire struck his home in New York, F. Donaldson Brown built a Georgian mansion, carriage house, and outbuildings atop a rocky cliff overlooking the Susquehanna River at Port Deposit. The mansion had more than 20 bedrooms, two spiral staircases, and views of the river from a bluff on the Cecil County side of the Susquehanna. It is considered one of Maryland's most visible and iconic homes. The sprawling estate is visible from Interstate 95 off the Millard E. Tydings Memorial Bridge.

The Donaldson Brown Center consists of 23.43 acres and includes a 28,384 SF two-story, Georgian mansion constructed in 1938, a 10,456 SF carriage house and a freestanding 3,934 SF greenhouse. It continues to provide visitors with views from atop the cliff, Mt. Ararat (a rock cliff overlooking the Susquehanna River, located between Port Deposit and Perryville, Cecil County, Maryland).

In 1965, the manor and surrounding property was donated to the University System of Maryland, and the mansion is administered by the University of Maryland, Baltimore. Currently, the estate is utilized as a historic venue for conferences and weddings.
