= Georgetown, Floyd County, Indiana =

Georgetown, Indiana
- Town
- Town of Georgetown
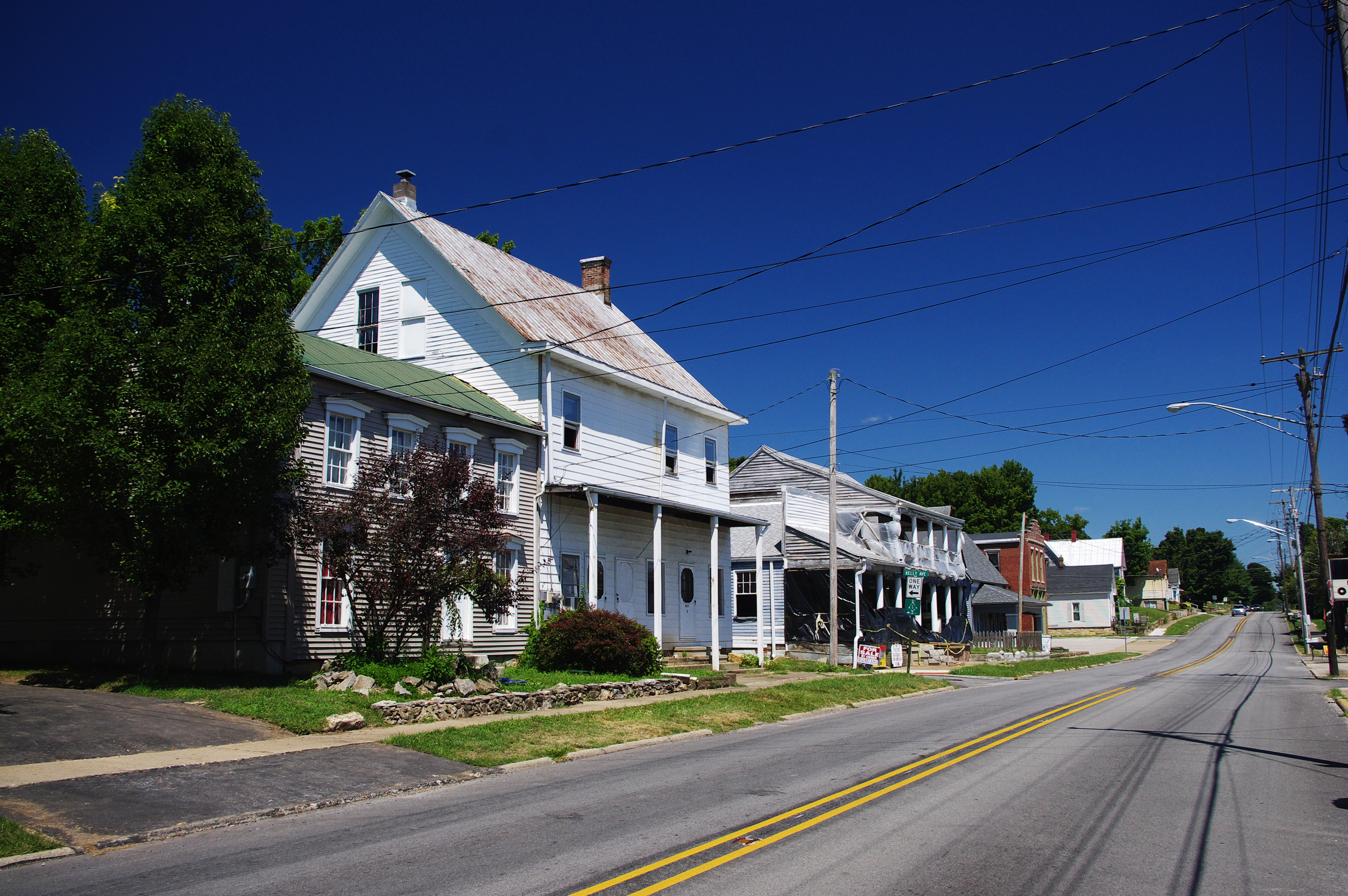
- Main Street (SR 64)

- Logo

- Location of Georgetown in Floyd County, Indiana.
- Coordinates: 38°18′0″N 85°58′15″W
- Country: United States
- State: Indiana
- County: Floyd

Area
  - Total: 2.19 sq mi (5.68 km^{2})
  - Land: 2.18 sq mi (5.64 km^{2})
  - Water: 0.019 sq mi (0.05 km^{2})
- Elevation: 755 ft (230 m)

Population (2020)
  - Total: 3,805
  - Density: 1,748.6/sq mi (675.15/km^{2})
- Time zone: UTC-5 (EST)
  - Summer (DST): UTC-4 (EDT)
- ZIP codes: 47122
- Area codes: 812 & 930
- FIPS code: 18-27324
- GNIS feature ID: 2396958
- Website: www.in.gov/towns/georgetown/

Georgetown is a town in Floyd County, Indiana, United States. The population was 3,805 at the 2020 census.

== History ==
Georgetown was platted in 1833 by George W. Waltz (1767–1850), and named for him. The Georgetown post office was established in 1837.

The Georgetown Historic District was listed on the National Register of Historic Places in 2013. The Yenowine-Nichols-Collins House was listed in 1975 and delisted in 2008.

== Geography ==
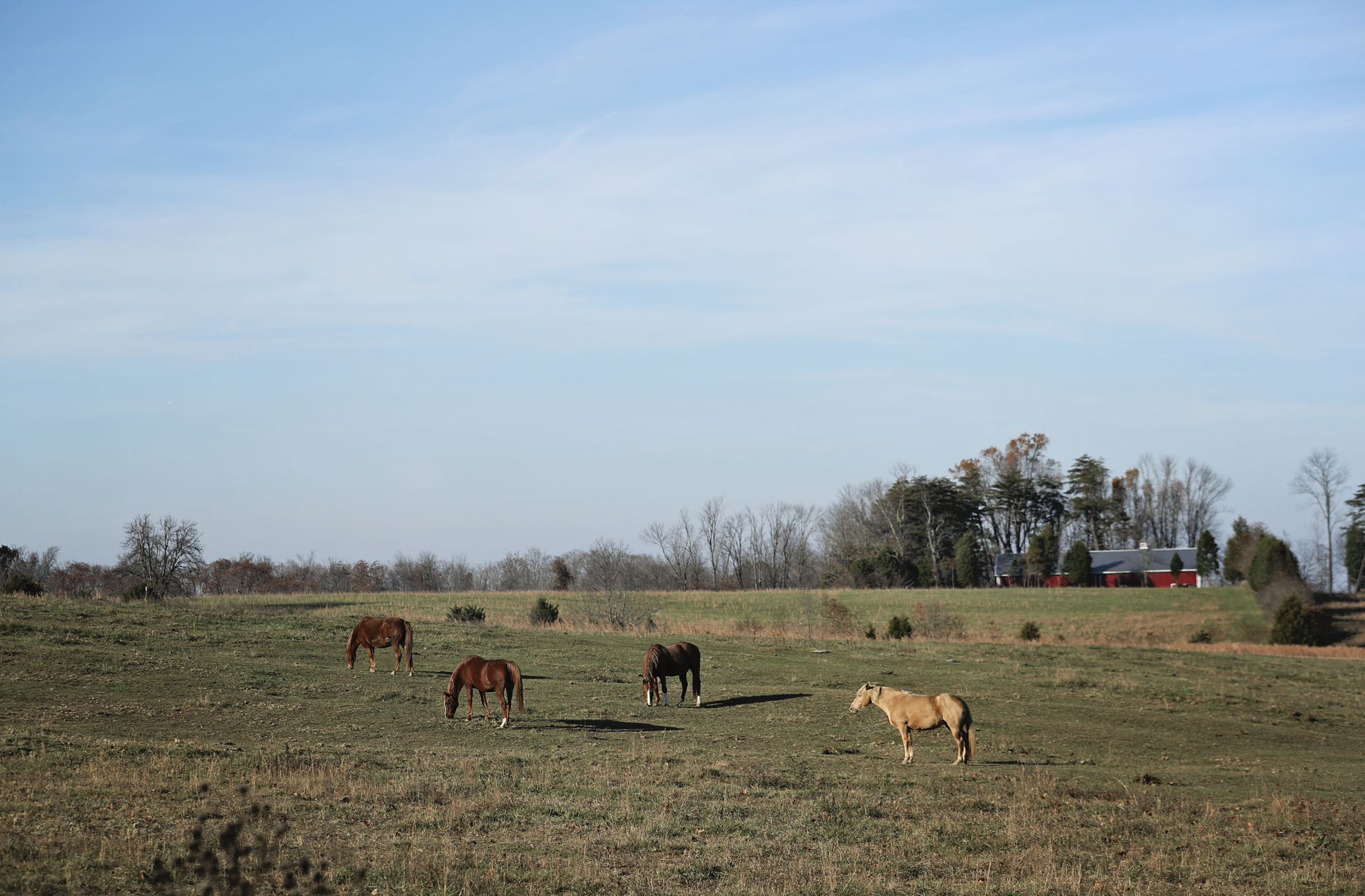
Horses graze on a farm along Henriott Road in Georgetown Township.

According to the 2010 census, Georgetown has a total area of 2.07 square miles (5.36 km^{2}), of which 2.05 square miles (5.31 km^{2}) (or 99.03%) is land and 0.02 square miles (0.05 km^{2}) (or 0.97%) is water.

== Demographics ==
Historical population
Census	Pop.	Note	%±
1880	218		—
1890	256		17.4%
1900	350		36.7%
1910	331		−5.4%
1920	401		21.1%
1930	374		−6.7%
1940	377		0.8%
1950	449		19.1%
1960	643		43.2%
1970	1,273		98.0%
1980	1,494		17.4%
1990	2,092		40.0%
2000	2,227		6.5%
2010	2,876		29.1%
2020	3,805		32.3%
U.S. Decennial Census

=== 2010 census ===
As of the census of 2010, there were 2,876 people, 1,088 households, and 814 families residing in the town. The population density was 1,402.9 inhabitants per square mile (541.7/km^{2}). There were 1,166 housing units at an average density of 568.8 per square mile (219.6/km^{2}). The racial makeup of the town was 97.3% White, 0.3% African American, 0.3% Native American, 0.6% Asian, 0.5% from other races, and 1.1% from two or more races. Hispanic or Latino of any race were 1.9% of the population.

There were 1,088 households, of which 40.8% had children under the age of 18 living with them, 58.4% were married couples living together, 11.9% had a female householder with no husband present, 4.6% had a male householder with no wife present, and 25.2% were non-families. 21.2% of all households were made up of individuals, and 6.8% had someone living alone who was 65 years of age or older. The average household size was 2.64 and the average family size was 3.08.

The median age in the town was 35.4 years. 27.7% of residents were under the age of 18; 6.9% were between the ages of 18 and 24; 29.9% were from 25 to 44; 26.5% were from 45 to 64; and 9% were 65 years of age or older. The gender makeup of the town was 48.3% male and 51.7% female.

=== 2000 census ===
As of the census of 2000, there were 2,227 people, 794 households, and 655 families residing in the town. The population density was 1,242.4 inhabitants per square mile (479.7/km^{2}). There were 830 housing units at an average density of 463.1 per square mile (178.8/km^{2}). The racial makeup of the town was 98.61% White, 0.22% African American, 0.13% Native American, 0.22% Asian, 0.04% Pacific Islander, 0.13% from other races, and 0.63% from two or more races. Hispanic or Latino of any race were 0.49% of the population.

There were 794 households, out of which 44.0% had children under the age of 18 living with them, 68.4% were married couples living together, 10.7% had a female householder with no husband present, and 17.4% were non-families. 14.7% of all households were made up of individuals, and 4.4% had someone living alone who was 65 years of age or older. The average household size was 2.80 and the average family size was 3.09.

In the town, the population was spread out, with 27.8% under the age of 18, 7.9% from 18 to 24, 34.0% from 25 to 44, 24.0% from 45 to 64, and 6.2% who were 65 years of age or older. The median age was 34 years. For every 100 females, there were 101.7 males. For every 100 females age 18 and over, there were 95.0 males.

The median income for a household in the town was $48,795, and the median income for a family was $51,667. Males had a median income of $36,204 versus $25,987 for females. The per capita income for the town was $18,645. About 2.7% of families and 3.1% of the population were below the poverty line, including 3.2% of those under age 18 and 2.0% of those age 65 or over.

== Education ==
New Albany-Floyd County Consolidated School Corporation serves Georgetown. Georgetown is within the attendance boundaries of Georgetown Elementary School, Highland Hills Middle School, and Floyd Central High School.

Georgetown Elementary School is in the Georgetown town limits. Highland Hills Middle School is located in an unincorporated area near Georgetown.

== Notable people ==
- R. Carlyle Buley, who was awarded the Pulitzer Prize for History in 1951, was born in Georgetown on July 8, 1893
- David Camm, who was charged with murder of his wife and children then exonerated 13 years later and now a high-profile campaigner for victims of miscarriages of justice, was born in Georgetown on March 23, 1964.
- Sherman Minton, United States Senator and Associate Justice of the Supreme Court, was born in Georgetown on October 20, 1890.
