= Sherman Minton =

US Supreme Court justice (1890–1965)

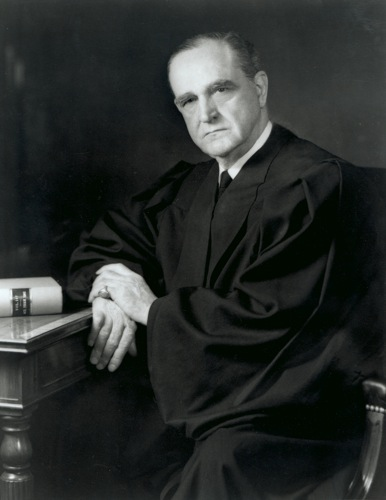
- Official portrait, 1954

Associate Justice of the Supreme Court of the United States
- In office October 12, 1949 – October 15, 1956
- Nominated by: Harry S. Truman
- Preceded by: Wiley Rutledge
- Succeeded by: William J. Brennan Jr.

Judge of the United States Court of Appeals for the Seventh Circuit
- In office May 22, 1941 – October 11, 1949
- Nominated by: Franklin D. Roosevelt
- Preceded by: Walter Emanuel Treanor
- Succeeded by: Walter C. Lindley

Senate Majority Whip
- In office July 22, 1937 – January 3, 1941
- Leader: Alben W. Barkley
- Preceded by: J. Hamilton Lewis
- Succeeded by: J. Lister Hill

United States Senator from Indiana
- In office January 3, 1935 – January 3, 1941
- Preceded by: Arthur Raymond Robinson
- Succeeded by: Raymond E. Willis

Personal details
- Born: Sherman Minton; October 20, 1890 Georgetown, Indiana, U.S.
- Died: April 9, 1965 (aged 74) New Albany, Indiana, U.S.
- Party: Democratic
- Spouse: Gertrude Gurtz (m. 1917)
- Children: 3, including Sherman Jr.
- Education: Indiana University Bloomington (BA); Indiana University Maurer School of Law (LLB); Yale University (LLM)

Military service
- Allegiance: United States
- Branch/service: United States Army
- Years of service: 1917–1919
- Rank: Captain
- Unit: 84th Division, American Expeditionary Forces
- Battles/wars: World War I; Battle of Verdun; Battle of Soissons

Sherman "Shay" Minton (October 20, 1890 – April 9, 1965) was an American politician and jurist who served as a U.S. senator from Indiana and later became an associate justice of the Supreme Court of the United States; he was a member of the Democratic Party.

After attending college and law school, Minton served as a captain in World War I, following which he launched a legal and political career. In 1930, after multiple failed election attempts, and serving as a regional leader in the American Legion, he became a utility commissioner under the administration of Paul V. McNutt, Governor of Indiana. Four years later, Minton was elected to the United States Senate. During the campaign, he defended New Deal legislation in a series of addresses in which he suggested it was not necessary to uphold the United States Constitution during the Great Depression. Minton's campaign was denounced by his political opponents, and he received more widespread criticism for an address that became known as the "You Cannot Eat the Constitution" speech. As part of the New Deal Coalition, Minton championed President Franklin D. Roosevelt's unsuccessful court packing plans in the Senate and became one of his top Senate allies.

After Minton failed in his 1940 Senate reelection bid, Roosevelt appointed him as a United States circuit judge of the United States Court of Appeals for the Seventh Circuit. After Roosevelt's death, President Harry S. Truman, who had developed a close friendship with Minton during their time together in the Senate, nominated him to the Supreme Court. He was confirmed by the Senate on October 4, 1949, by a vote of 48 to 16, 15 Republicans and one Democrat (Harry Flood Byrd of Virginia) voting against him. He served on the Supreme Court for seven years. An advocate of judicial restraint, Minton was a regular supporter of the majority opinions during his early years on the Court; he became a regular dissenter after President Dwight Eisenhower's appointees altered the court's composition. In 1956, poor health forced Minton to retire, after which he traveled and lectured until his death in 1965. To date, he is the last member of the United States Congress to be named to the Supreme Court.

According to historians, Minton's judicial philosophy was largely a reaction to the relationship between the New Deal senators and the conservative 1930s Court, which ruled much of the New Deal legislation unconstitutional. Minton believed the Supreme Court should be more deferential to the political branches of government, and supported a broad interpretation of the powers of Congress. He generally opposed any effort to rule federal legislation unconstitutional on the principle that the court was overstepping its authority. As a result of his judicial philosophy, he sought to uphold the intent of the political branches of government. Historians note the unusual contrast this created between his role as a partisan liberal Senator and his role as a conservative jurist. When Minton became a Justice, the Senate had become more conservative, leading Minton to uphold the constitutionality and intention of conservative legislation. He often played peacemaker and consensus builder during a period when the Court was riven by feuds. He generally ruled in favor of order over freedom as a result of his broad interpretation of governmental powers. These rulings and their limited impact have given some historians a negative opinion of his judicial record. Other historians consider Minton's strong commitment to his judicial principles laudable. In 1962, the Sherman Minton Bridge in southern Indiana and the Minton–Capehart Federal Building in Indianapolis were named in his honor.

== Early life ==
=== Family and background ===
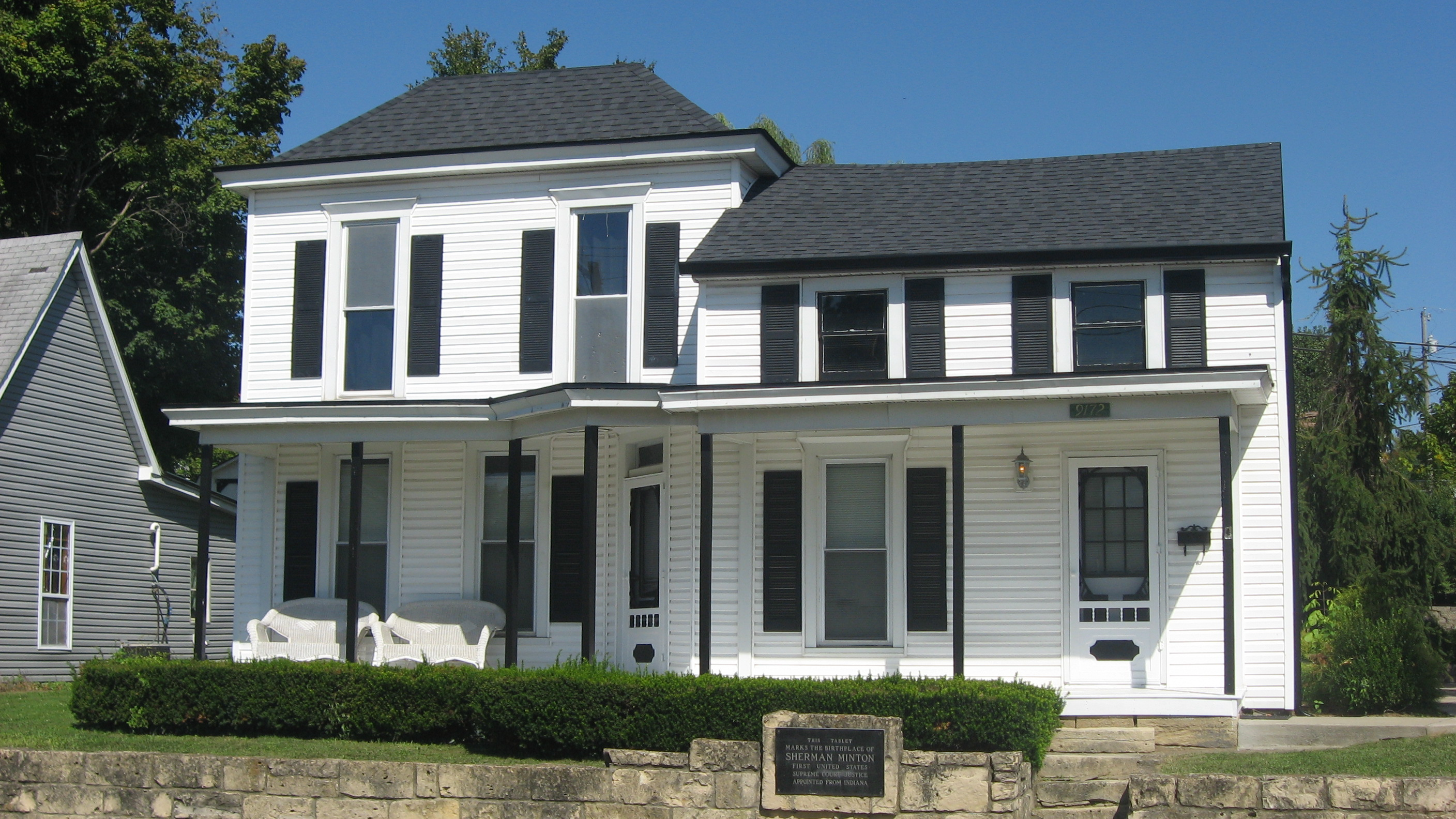
Minton's birthplace and boyhood home

Minton was born on October 20, 1890, to John Evan and Emma Livers Minton, in their Georgetown, Indiana, home. He was the third of the couple's four children, and was nicknamed Shay because of his younger brother's inability to properly pronounce "Sherman". Minton received his basic education in a two-room schoolhouse in Georgetown, which he attended through eighth grade. He was exposed to politics from an early age: when he was five years old, his father took him to hear a speech by William Jennings Bryan, whom Minton admired for the remainder of his life.

His father, a railroad laborer, became disabled in 1898 when he suffered heat stroke while working. Afterwards, he took up various jobs, including as a farmer, a butcher, and a grocer; Sherman also began working odd jobs to help his financially unstable family. Soon after John's heat stroke, Minton's mother was diagnosed with breast cancer; a doctor attempted to remove her tumors in April 1900, performing the operation on the Minton's family dinner table, but she died during the procedure. The death was an emotional blow to Minton, and he found it impossible to reconcile with the idea of a loving and just God, leading him to shun organized religion for much of his life. Minton's father married Sarah Montague on December 3, 1901.

Minton enjoyed school but was a mischievous child. In 1904 he was arrested for riding his bicycle on the sidewalk and was taken before a justice of the peace, who fined him one dollar ($40 in current dollar terms) plus court costs. He later credited the incident with sparking his desire to become a lawyer. To accomplish that, he joined his older brother Herbert in Fort Worth, Texas, where he took a job at the Swift & Company meatpacking plant. His father, stepmother, and younger siblings soon joined him there. After saving enough money to continue his education, Minton returned to Georgetown, where he lived with relatives and attended high school.

=== Education ===
Minton started at Edwardsville High School, but after that school closed, he attended New Albany High School for the remaining three years. There he participated in the football, baseball, and track teams. He helped start the school's first debate club, the Wranglers, which won several awards. He worked in a local arcade, and during summer vacations returned to Fort Worth to work at the Swift plant. He was briefly expelled from school after committing a prank in February 1908, and the superintendent, Charles Allen Prosser, let Minton return only after he formally apologized before the entire school. Minton began dating Gertrude Gurtz, whom he later married, in his senior year. He graduated high school in 1910.

To earn money to attend college, Minton resumed working for Swift & Company in Fort Worth and played baseball semi-professionally. In September 1911, he enrolled at Indiana University Bloomington, where he participated in a combined program that enabled him to complete both his undergraduate and law degrees in only four years. Despite the heavy workload, he played multiple sports, joined the debate team, and participated in the Jackson Club, an organization for Democrats. While at Indiana, he also joined and was a member of the Phi Delta Theta fraternity. His classmates included future Governor of Indiana Paul V. McNutt and future presidential candidate Wendell L. Willkie, both of whom later had substantial impacts on Minton's political career. Minton's high academic standing entitled him to serve as librarian at the legal college. The position, which paid thirty dollars a month, allowed him to live more comfortably in law school. He graduated first in his class with an LL.B. degree in September 1915.

Minton won a one-year scholarship to take graduate courses at Yale Law School, where he earned a Master of Laws degree cum laude in 1916. At Yale he took a constitutional law seminar with former President and future Chief Justice of the United States William Howard Taft, who is said to have described a paper Minton wrote as one of best ever written at the school. Along with Lewis F. Powell Jr., Minton is one of two United States Supreme Court justices who earned an LL.M. degree. Minton continued to improve his oratory and debate at Yale; he won the Wayland Club prize for extemporaneous public speaking, and helped organize the university's legal aid society.

=== Legal career and World War I ===
Minton spent the summer of 1916 earning money as a platform manager on the Chautauqua lecture circuit. In fall 1916, Minton returned to New Albany, where he renewed his relationship with Gurtz and opened a law practice. Soon thereafter, however, the United States entered World War I, and Minton quickly enlisted in the United States Army. He took an officers' training course at Fort Benjamin Harrison in hope of earning a commission, but was not among those chosen to become an officer. After taking a brief leave of absence in August to marry Gurtz, (Note: Gertrude Gurtz was a native of Harrison County. She had graduated from St. Mary-of-the-Woods and worked as a schoolteacher in New Albany. (see: Radcliff, p. 25)) Minton returned to camp and requested to repeat his training course, still hoping to receive a commission; after finishing the training he was commissioned as a captain. The Eighty-Fourth Division, to which Minton belonged, was dispatched to France in July 1918. Minton was then assigned to John J. Pershing's general staff; he served on the Soissons, Verdun, and Belgian fronts. His tasks included scouting roads to ensure safe transport of men and supplies.

After the war ended, Minton continued to serve with the Army of Occupation until being discharged in August 1919. While in Paris he studied Roman law, international law, civil law and jurisprudence at the Sorbonne's Faculté de Droit. He was in Versailles when the peace treaty was signed. Returning home after his discharge, Minton met his son, Sherman Anthony, who had been born in February. Two more children, Mary-Anne and John, were born in 1923 and 1925, respectively.

== Political career ==
When Minton returned home, he decided to run for Congress in Indiana's 3rd district instead of immediately resuming his law practice. Despite his war record and his active campaigning, he lost the 1920 Democratic primary to John Ewing by a wide margin. Afterwards, he briefly joined the Indiana law firm of Stonsenburg and Weathers before moving to Miami, Florida, where he joined another firm, Shutts & Bowen, in 1925. In January 1928, he left the Miami practice and returned to Indiana, where he rejoined the Stonsenburg and Weathers firm. In 1930, he again sought the Democratic congressional nomination in the 3rd District but was again defeated, this time by Eugene B. Crowe, who won by four thousand votes.

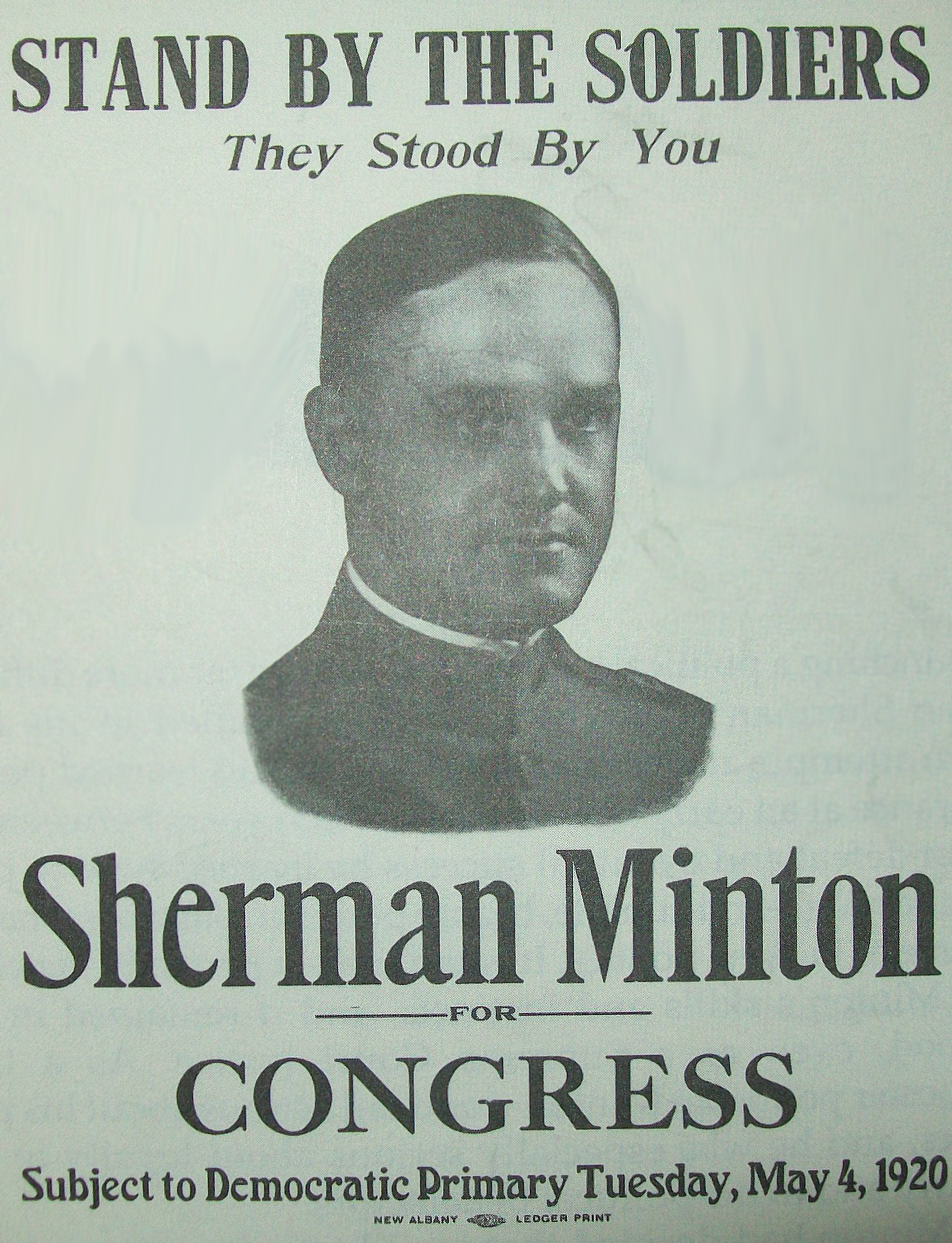
1920 primary campaign poster for Minton

The following year, Minton became a local commander of the American Legion. The group had a large and active membership in the state at the time, and he used his position to encourage support of the Democratic Party agenda. Paul McNutt was the national commander, and the two men became political allies. When McNutt became Governor of Indiana in 1932, he offered Minton a position at the head of a new utility regulation commission. As commissioner, Minton successfully imposed regulations that reduced state telephone rates by $525,000 a year. The cuts received widespread media coverage, and Minton was credited in the reports with the success.

=== U.S. Senate campaign ===
Becoming popular among the party leadership during his two years as commissioner, Minton was encouraged by party leaders to run for the United States Senate in 1934. At the state Democratic Party Convention he ran against Earl Peters, a former chairman of the state party. With the support of McNutt, Minton won the nomination on the third ballot with 827 votes to Peters' 586.

Minton launched a statewide campaign in August 1934 and began delivering speeches in defense of the New Deal. He blamed Republicans for the conditions of the Great Depression. His opponent, incumbent Republican Senator Arthur Raymond Robinson, accused Minton of playing "Santa Claus" by trying to give everyone "presents". He also criticized Minton's support of the New Deal, which Robinson and Republicans called unconstitutional. Minton's initial campaign slogan was "You can't offer a hungry man the Constitution", a slogan he unveiled in a debate with Robinson in Corydon on August 11. He continued using the slogan, and on September 11, Minton delivered his infamous "You Cannot Eat the Constitution" speech, (Note: The speech was so named by newspapers who printed excerpts. In the speech Minton stated, "You cannot walk up to a hungry man today and say, 'Here have a Constitution'," and "you can't expect a farmer to dig himself out his debts with a Constitution." He finished his speech with. "let us keep our priorities realistic; in times like these the needs of the people take precedence over all else." (see: Radcliff, p. 40)) in which he concluded the urgent needs of the masses outweighed the need to uphold the Constitution. The speech backfired wildly and papers and opponents across the state called Minton's remarks traitorous. Minton stopped using the slogan and explained his position again using new terms, but his opponents continued to dog him over the issue. The Republicans also faulted popular governor McNutt and his reorganization of the government, and McNutt became more personally involved in the election. With the state party's more direct involvement, Minton won the election with 52 percent of the vote.

=== Lobby Investigation Committee ===
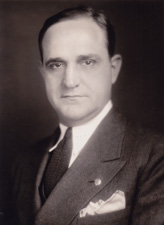
Senator Sherman Minton

Minton took his Senate seat in January 1935. As a freshman, he sat in the back row of the chamber next to fellow freshman Harry Truman, and the pair quickly became friends. Minton was made a member of a special Lobby Investigation Committee chaired by Senator Hugo Black, that was set up to look into questionable lobbyist groups. According to professor of political science Linda C. Gugin, a Minton biographer, in practice the committee's investigations were politically motivated and directed against groups that were challenging New Deal legislation.

William Randolph Hearst, a prominent and wealthy media magnate, began using his newspapers to deride the committee's "reckless attacks on freedom". Minton led the effort to counter Hearst and delivered a speech criticizing his support of the Republican Party. In 1937, Senator Black was appointed to the Supreme Court and left the Senate, and Minton secured his post as chair of the committee. Minton immediately began a full-scale investigation of the media conglomerate controlled by Frank E. Gannett, accusing him of publishing Republican Party propaganda. For several weeks, Minton delivered speeches against Gannett in the Senate, and Gannett responded in kind in his newspapers. Minton finally introduced legislation that would have made it "illegal to publish information known to be false". Gannett, and a large number of allies in newspapers and on radio, immediately began to charge Minton and the Democratic Party with an assault on the freedom of the press. Minton's allies in Congress asked him to withdraw the bill because of its political repercussions, and he dropped the matter.

Minton tried again to expose what he believed to be Republican control of the media. He led the committee to target a newspaper with national circulation, Rural Progress. Minton accused the publishers of improperly accepting large sums of money from corporations and the editors of undue influence from this money. The owner of the paper, Maurive V. Renolds, was summoned before the committee for a hearing, where Minton demanded to know why he was accepting money from corporations. When Renolds asked his manager, Dr. Glen Frank, to help him answer the questions, Minton and fellow Democratic senators began to shout Dr. Frank down. As he was saying that the money from the corporations was for advertising in the magazine, Minton beat his gavel and yelled, "This committee doesn't intend to permit you to use this as a forum to air your Republican views."

Minton did not realize that Frank was also president of the University of Wisconsin, and soon suffered retaliation for the way he had treated Frank. Frank went on NBC radio stations around the country and lambasted Minton for his rudeness. He made lengthy arguments accusing Minton of attempting to violate the Bill of Rights. Minton was outraged, but the arguments had an effect among voters in Indiana. In 1938, he sought funding to launch a massive nationwide investigation of media conglomerates for proof of Republican interference in the press. Democratic Senator Edward R. Burke led an effort to defeat the measure and privately accused Minton of damaging the Democrats' cause, which led Minton to leave the Lobby Investigation Committee.

Minton was a fierce partisan during his time in the Senate, and regularly abused his opponents verbally. Democratic Senator Huey Long became one of Minton's favorite targets because of Long's often-threatened filibusters. During one of the filibusters, Long threatened to join the Republican Party. After most senators had left the chamber, Minton remained for several hours to periodically taunt Long. After tiring of the taunts, Long launched a rebuttal from the podium, calling Minton a vicious politician whose positions would cost Minton re-election. The exchange was unusual for its tone and later made national news.

Minton was involved in many such exchanges, including a particularly fierce one with Republican Senator Lester J. Dickinson in March 1936. Dickinson delivered a speech in the Senate castigating President Franklin D. Roosevelt for carrying out what he termed illegal and unconstitutional acts. Minton responded with a range of accusations, some personal, against Dickinson and his "political naivety".

=== Court packing ===
In 1936, the United States Supreme Court ruled the Agricultural Adjustment Act of 1933 unconstitutional. For the first time, Minton gave speeches criticizing the court for overriding the will of Congress. He accused the court of allowing itself to be influenced by political motives rather than the law. In response to the court ruling, Minton began drafting a bill which would allow the Supreme Court to declare a law unconstitutional only if seven out the nine justices supported the decision. In February 1937, before Minton introduced his bill, President Roosevelt introduced a plan of his own to deal with the Supreme Court. Roosevelt proposed adding more justices to the court and creating a mandatory retirement age; the changes would allow him to appoint an overwhelming majority to the court, more sympathetic to his agenda, ensuring the safety of legislation passed by his party.

Minton was pleased with Roosevelt's bill and quickly became its leading supporter in the Senate. The measure was placed in an omnibus bill designed to reform judicial salaries and districting, among many other measures. Republicans quickly discovered the court-packing provision and targeted the bill. At the time, Democrats held super-majorities in both chambers of Congress, and passage of the bill at first seemed assured. Minton's support of the bill helped him earn the position of Senate majority whip, allowing him to more effectively push for its passage. Minton delivered six radio addresses on behalf of his party in support of the bill, but public opinion could not be swayed in the Democrats' favor.

Minton received a death threat in the form of an envelope containing a shotgun shell and a message advising him to not vote for the court packing plan. Many Democrats, fearing their re-election prospects, joined with Republicans and defeated the bill. Minton was unhappy with the loss and it cost him considerable support among his voters, but as a result of his close connection with the bill and the leaders of his party, he gained more influence with the Democrats. When Justice Willis Van Devanter retired from the Court in May 1937, Minton was among the final three candidates considered by Roosevelt to succeed him, but the senator declined due to concerns over the impact his recent public criticisms of sitting Court members would have on his relationships with them.

Most controversial of all, Minton proposed a bill in April 1938 to make it a felony for newspapers or other periodicals to publish as "fact anything known to the publisher, or his, or its, responsible agents, to be false," punishable by up to a two-year prison sentence or a $10,000 fine. Minton made clear that his main targets were the anti-New Deal press including the Chicago Daily Tribune and the Philadelphia Inquirer. "Those who know Senator Minton," Newsweek suggested, "say he must have had Roosevelt's tacit approval before introducing a bill to make news distortion a felony." The unanticipated opposition to the bill was overwhelming and transcended the political spectrum. Many charged that Minton was trying to muzzle the critics of the New Deal through censorship. When he raised the idea of a more "objective" across-the-board investigation, it too failed to gain support. A consequence of the reaction against the Minton Bill was to spur the formation of the Bill of Rights Committee of the American Bar Association.

Although Minton supported the Roosevelt Administration and became a regular guest at the White House, Minton broke with the president on some measures. He voted to override a presidential veto of a grant of $2.5 billion ($43 billion in 2015 dollars) in bonus pay for World War I soldiers (Bonus Army). Minton also supported Republican Leonidas Dyer's anti-lynching bill, which Roosevelt feared would cost the party support in the southern states. He also supported an extension of the Hatch Act of 1939, a law that prevented federal employees from being forced to take part in state election campaigns, effectively lessening the influence of federal patronage.

As World War II neared, Minton took a cautious position on United States involvement. When the Soviet Union invaded Finland, Minton voted against granting a loan to Finland to help finance its defense efforts. He also opposed selling munitions and weapons to the Allies or the Axis powers. He advocated and supported expanding the American military and believed that American entry into the war was inevitable, but should be delayed as long as possible. He voted in favor of the Smith Act, which made it a crime to advocate the overthrow of the government, a law specifically targeted at communists and fascists in the United States. In his final year in office, there was considerable speculation in the press that Minton would be named to higher office by Roosevelt, including cabinet positions and the Supreme Court, but neither happened.

=== Re-election campaign ===
Minton ran for re-election to his Senate seat in 1940. McNutt was challenging Roosevelt for the Presidential nomination, forcing Minton to choose between the administration and his allies in the state party. Minton sided with Roosevelt, which cost him McNutt's and the Indiana Democratic Party machine's support in his re-election bid.

The Republican presidential candidate, Wendell Willkie was also a native of Indiana, and Minton faced a difficult challenge to win re-election. He referred to Willkie as a "sycophant for the rich and famous". Willkie never responded to Minton's taunts, leaving Minton's opponent in the Senate race, Raymond E. Willis, to do so in his stead. Willis had run for the Senate two years earlier but was defeated by Democrat Frederick Van Nuys. Willis faulted Minton on a range of topics but focused on the legislation Minton supported while in the Senate. Willis claimed that much of the legislation was unconstitutional and Minton's positions were detrimental to the nation. Minton responded by pointing out Willis's connections to wealthy corporations and accused him of not caring for the people. Minton's campaign focused on the achievements of the New Deal programs. He claimed farm income in Indiana had doubled since 1932, and highlighted the passage of the Old Age Pension laws. His support for conscription and military preparedness for the coming war proved unpopular with voters and cost him considerable support, but according to historian William Radcliff it was Willkie's favorite son status, which led many Hoosiers to vote Republican, that proved to be the election's deciding factor. Despite Minton's heavy campaigning, he lost the close election to Willis by 5,179 votes out of over 1.5 million cast.

Roosevelt won the 1940 presidential election. After Minton left office in January 1941, he was given a position in the Roosevelt administration as a reward for his loyalty during the court packing failure. He served as one of the president's advisers and a liaison between the White House and Congress. The extent of his duties is not fully known; Linda Gugin has speculated that he may have managed Roosevelt's patronage system. Minton was responsible for getting several officials appointed to high offices in the federal bureaucracy and numerous others appointed to lower ranking positions. He also convinced Roosevelt to support the creation of a Senate defense committee chaired by Truman, a position that brought Truman into the national spotlight and helped him gain the vice presidency.

== Seventh Circuit ==
=== Appointment ===
On May 7, 1941, Roosevelt announced Minton's nomination to the Chicago-based United States Court of Appeals for the Seventh Circuit. Minton was confirmed unanimously by the Senate on May 12, 1941, and received his commission on May 22, 1941. Minton resigned from his post in the administration, but even after he began working on the court, Minton remained active in Democratic politics behind the scenes and was in regular correspondence with Roosevelt to make patronage suggestions.

Minton took his oath of office on May 29, 1941, but the court was in recess at the time. He took his seat when it returned to session on October 7, 1941. The court had the highest court load of all the appellate courts in the nation at that time, averaging 40 cases per judge annually. The men on the court were close friends, and Minton developed a particularly close friendship with Judge J. Earl Major; Major offered Minton financial assistance during his later illnesses. Major had been on the court for several years and held a judicial philosophy similar to Minton's. The two men regularly attended baseball games and were frequent guests in each other's homes.

World War II broke out shortly after Minton joined the court, creating a flood of cases in which legal precedent provided little guidance, including challenges to wartime measures, selective service laws, price controls, rationing and civil liberties. In the majority of these cases, the court affirmed the decisions of the district courts, but in several the court was required to establish a precedent. Minton stated on several occasions his personal preference to affirm the decisions of the lower courts. He believed that the court that heard the case and pronounced judgment was generally able to make a decision that was superior to appellate courts' decisions. He believed the appellate process should be reserved for the more serious cases and cases where the lower court had clearly made a mistake.

=== Jurisprudence ===
Minton was described by William Radcliff as a "faithful disciple of judicial restraint," an unexpected development when compared to his overtly partisan political career. Radcliff attributed Minton's conservative position to the distaste he developed for the courts when they overturned legislation passed while he was in the Senate. The courts' actions led him to strongly believe in the limited exercise of judicial power when evaluating the constitutionality of governmental conduct. Much of the recently passed New Deal legislation was being tried in the courts for constitutionality and enforcement, putting Minton in the uncommon position of adjudicating cases which depended on legislation he had helped write.

During his time on the Seventh Circuit, Minton authored 253 of the court's opinions, including twelve dissenting opinions. Some of his opinions won praise; the editors of Tax Magazine commented favorably on Minton's opinions on tax law, calling them "direct Hoosier logic". Other court reporting papers made similar comments, applauding the manner in which he turned complex issues to simple questions that could easily be understood.

In the cases of California Fruit Growers Exchange v. Sunkist Baking Co. and Quaker Oats Co. v. General Mills, Inc., the court held that it was possible for different companies to use the same brand and product name as long as they produced dissimilar products. In another case, the court set a short-lived precedent allowing companies to artificially raise prices in local markets if the purpose was to artificially lower prices in another market to remain competitive. After Minton joined the United States Supreme Court, the decision was appealed to that body; Minton recused himself from the case, which the court decided to overturn. In another decision, Minton was in the majority that ruled under the Sherman Antitrust Act that the New York Great Atlantic and Pacific Tea Company was a monopoly, ordering the company to break up its grocery business. Minton was also in the majority in several cases filed to enforce decisions made by the National Labor Relations Board, usually to end worker strikes.

In the case of United States v. Knauer, the government denied the wife of a United States citizen entry into the country because of her possible ties to Nazism. In a much-criticized majority opinion which Minton co-authored with Judge Major, he stated that the "alien did not have any legal right—[her] status was a political decision to be made by officials in government." Many liberals condemned the court at the time of the decision. The ruling was upheld by the Supreme Court in a 1946 appeal.

One of Minton's favorite cases was that of Modernistic Candies, Inc. v. Federal Trade Commission. The candy company produced a one-cent gumball dispenser in which almost all the gumballs were the same color. A few different-colored gumballs were included which, when dispensed, entitled the purchaser to a prize from the merchant who owned the machine. The FTC had an injunction put in place barring the company from producing the machines because they claimed it violated anti-gambling laws. Minton wrote the majority opinion and sided with the majority to keep the injunction in place, but dryly mocked the counsel for the defense and the gambling law, stating:

Counsel for the petitioner discussed at great length from a sociological point of view, of the age-old problem of the gambling instinct in the human being. According to his analysis, gambling pervades our entire economic system; thus insurance contracts are a gamble, stock and grain exchange transactions are gambles, and the farmer's dependence on weather is a gamble. Counsel's attempt to apply this analysis to the present case left us cold and unimpressed. He even reminded us that our great idol, Mr. Chief Justice John Marshall, in his day attended the horse races and wagered with his clergyman. In fact, they ran a book. As indicating how times have changed and how even our coarse nature has yielded to the protecting care of governmental policy, we confess we do not even know a bookmaker, clerical or otherwise, and our passes to the beautiful race tracks around Chicago lie in our desk unused.

Minton often lamented that he was required to "pronounce the law as it was written, but on no occasion [c]ould he make the law."

=== Clemency board and failing health ===
After Roosevelt's death and Truman's succession to the Presidency, Minton continued offering advice to the new administration on a range of topics, including patronage and political maneuvering. Truman appointed Minton as head of the War Department Clemency Board, a panel of judges charged with overseeing reviews of decisions made by the courts-martial. The panel met every two weeks which, along with his responsibilities on the circuit court, kept Minton very busy and afforded him little rest, leading to a deterioration in his health. While yachting with President Truman on Memorial Day in 1945, Truman asked Minton to accept an appointment to the position of Solicitor General of the United States. Minton declined because of his health, but he told Truman he would be interested in a seat on the Supreme Court.

In September 1945, Minton suffered a heart attack while in Washington; he was hospitalized for three months at Walter Reed Hospital. After returning to work, he was forced to rest regularly due to gradually worsening anemia, and he sought to lessen his workload. To further complicate his health, on August 5, 1949, Minton tripped over a stone in his yard and broke his leg. The injury forced him to walk with a cane for the remainder of his life.

== Supreme Court ==
=== Nomination and confirmation ===
At a September 15, 1949, news conference, Truman announced Minton's nomination to the Supreme Court, succeeding the late Justice Wiley Rutledge. Minton had already privately accepted the nomination several days earlier after a telephone conversation with Truman. Truman touted Minton's extensive law education and his years of experience on the circuit courts as the reason for his nomination.

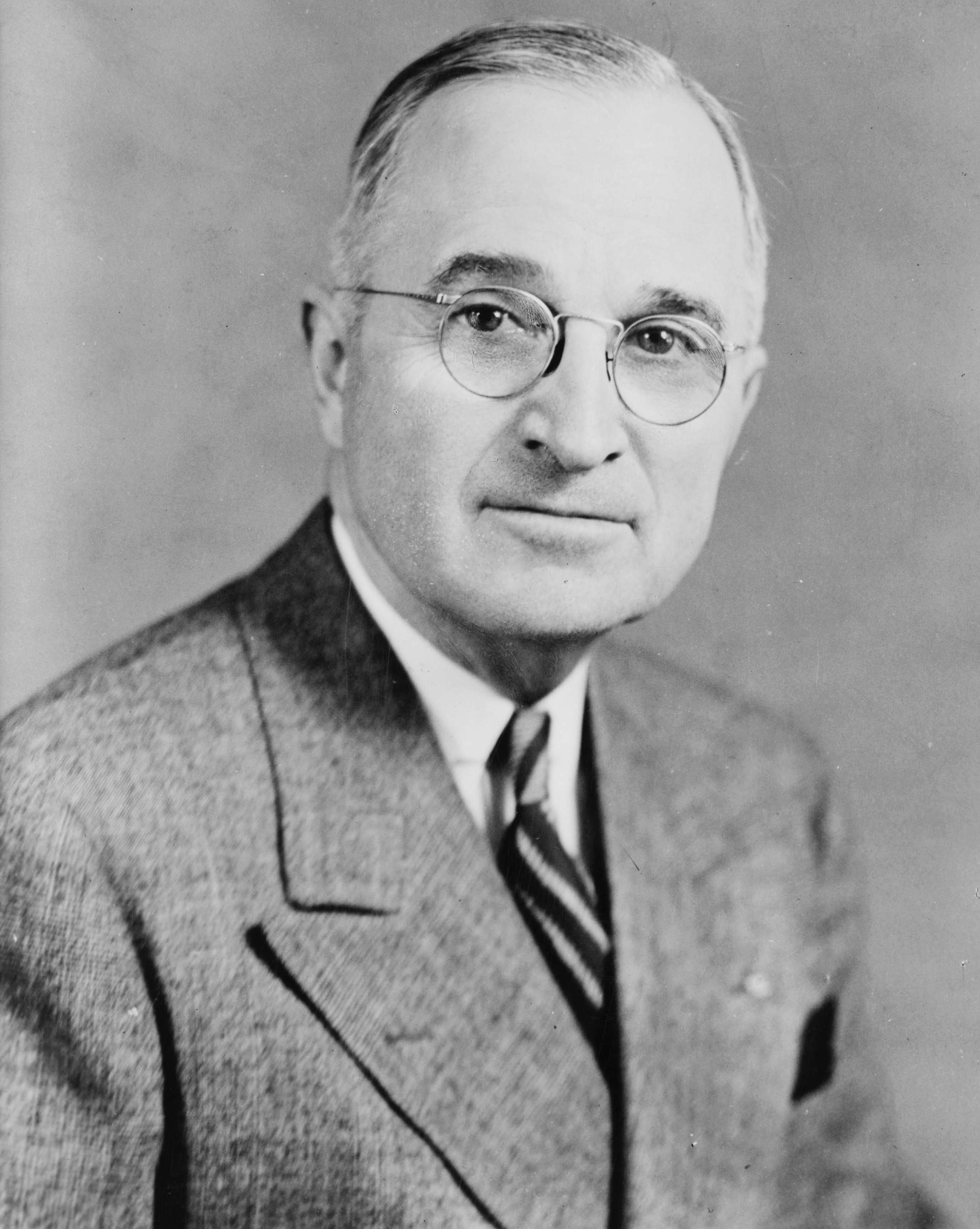
President Harry Truman

News of Minton's appointment received mixed reviews nationally. The New York Times said that Truman had allowed personal and political friendship to influence his choice. The New Republic said "the President is again reverting to his deplorable habit of choosing men for high post because they happen to be his friends...." The Washington Post raised questions about Minton's ability to be confirmed by the Senate due to the power many of his foes held in the body. The Indianapolis Star offered a more sympathetic opinion, pointing out Minton's qualifications and the pride Indiana could take in having a native on the Supreme Court. The article noted that he would be the most educated justice on the court, should he be confirmed.

Indiana Senator William E. Jenner led opponents of Minton's nomination, including some of Minton's old foes, in an attempt to bring him before the body for hearings. Minton wrote a letter to the Senate Judiciary Committee answering several of their questions, but refused to submit himself to a hearing. He mentioned his broken leg and hinted in his letter that it could be detrimental to his health to travel in his condition. He also stated that, as a sitting judge and former member of the Senate, it would be improper for him submit to a hearing. Minton responded to questions over his past support for the 1937 court packing scheme in the letter, declaring that as the Senate leader at the time of his scheme he had a right and duty to support the scheme, but as a federal judge his role had now changed to that of a referee rather than a player. Although hearings had occurred irregularly in the past, it was not customary at that time to have a hearing on a nominee. During an absence of Jenner's, Minton's allies worked to have the hearing request dropped. The Judiciary Committee held a single hearing on September 27, 1949, on his nomination. His nomination faced intense questioning from Republican Senators on his past support for the failed 1937 court packing scheme. The Senate Judiciary Committee voted 9–2 on October 3, 1949, to forward his nomination to the full Senate with a favorable report. On October 4, 1949, Senator Homer S. Ferguson attempted to have the nomination returned to committee but the motion failed, 42–45. The long debate over Minton's appointment focused on his partisanship, support of the court packing plan during his time in the Senate, and poor health. His opponents launched numerous delaying tactics; the Senate session before the vote to confirm Minton lasted until midnight. His confirmation was approved 48–16 on October 4, 1949, and he was sworn into office on October 12. To date, Minton remains the last member of Congress, sitting or former, to be appointed to the United States Supreme Court, and he is the only native of Indiana to be appointed to the court. (Note: Chief Justice John G. Roberts is the only other Supreme Court Justice from Indiana, but was not born in the state. ("John G. Roberts, Jr". NNDB. Archived from the original on June 29, 2011.)) (Note: See Demographics of the Supreme Court of the United States.)

=== Judicial restraint ===
Minton's central judicial philosophy was to ascertain and uphold the original intent of legislation. He continued to take a broad view of governmental powers, demonstrated in his dissenting vote in the case of Youngstown Sheet & Tube Co. v. Sawyer, which ruled unconstitutional President Truman's wartime seizure of several steel mills to avert a workers' strike. Of all the cases in which Minton was involved, he disagreed most with the Youngstown decision and "went into a tirade" during the conference where the decision was made. He argued that there "could be no vacant spot in power when the security of the nation is at stake." Despite his strong protest, he could not influence the Court to permit the president to seize the plants without congressional approval. Minton joined with Chief Justice Fred M. Vinson and Justice Stanley Forman Reed in the dissenting opinion that the President had the authority through the war powers clause of the constitution.

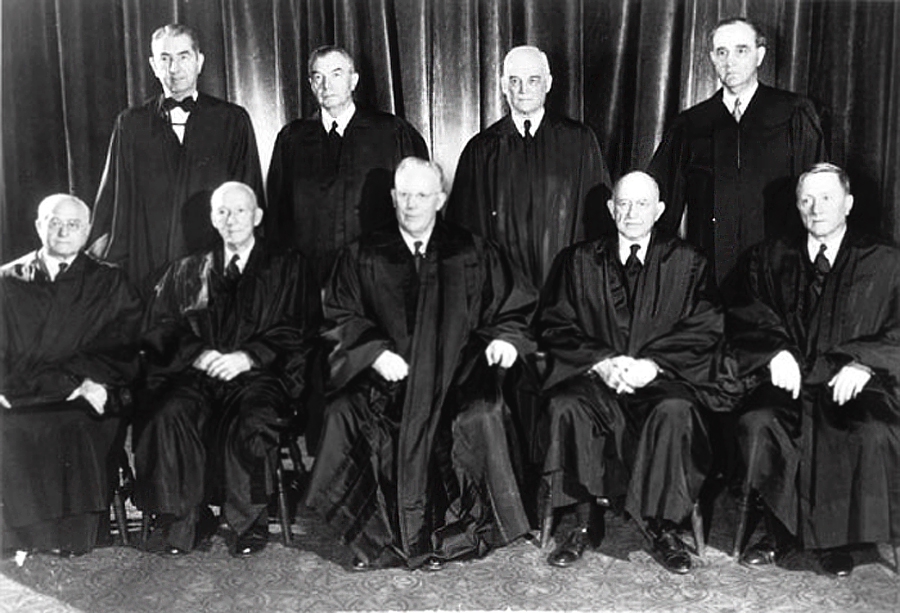
Warren Court in 1953; Minton standing at back right.

Minton abhorred racial segregation and provided a solid vote to strike down the school segregation practices at issue in 1954's landmark case of Brown v. Board of Education; it was among the few decisions in which he sided against the government. According to William Radcliff, the majority opinion authored by Minton in the 1953 case Barrows v. Jackson was his most skillfully written opinion. He framed the complex question of the case as: "Can a racially restrictive covenant be enforced at law by a suit for damages against a co-covenantor who allegedly broke the covenant?" The Court decided the answer in the negative.

In the area of civil liberties, Minton adhered to the doctrine of "fundamental fairness", a test established by the Supreme Court in 1937. In one decision, Minton stated that the right of free speech was not an absolute right, and could be regulated so as not to violate the rights of others. In United States v. Rabinowitz, Minton wrote the Court's opinion upholding a lower court ruling which allowed police to search automobiles without a warrant, provided there was probable cause to justify the search.

Minton voted to uphold anticommunist legislation during the period of the "red scare", siding with the majority in 1951's Dennis v. United States, which upheld the conviction of the leader of the US Communist Party. During the same period, the Court was split over the legality of governmental loyalty tests. Many agencies had programs in place to ensure that members of the government were not communists. Minton's vote proved to be the deciding factor in cases regarding loyalty tests. In the case of Bailey v. Richardson, Minton's vote upheld the legality of the loyalty tests, (Note: In the case of Bailey v. Richardson the Court made a split decision resulting in the upholding of the lower Court's ruling by default. (see: Gugin (1997), p. 229)) while in the decision he authored in the case of Joint Anti-Fascist Refugee Committee v. McGrath, he voted to uphold the plaintiff's position that he had been terminated illegally because of his support of fascist ideology. Minton's position gradually shifted to allowing the loyalty tests to take place, and in Adler v. Board of Ed. of City of New York he wrote the majority opinion allowing the tests and upholding New York's Feinberg Law. (Note: In the decisions in Adler v. Board of Ed. of City of New York, Minton wrote, "From time immemorial, one's reputation has been determined in part by the company he keeps. In the employment of officials and teachers of the school system, the state may very properly inquire into the company they keep, and we know of no rule, constitutional or otherwise, that prevents the state, when determining the fitness and loyalty of such persons, from considering the organizations and persons with whom they associate." (See: 341 U.S. 123 (1951))) This proved to be the most important vote as it allowed the tests to be given with only minimal suspicion of a person's disloyalty to the government.

Because of Minton's previous Congressional partisanship, many liberals believed he would support their positions when on the Court. Throughout his tenure, Minton regularly disappointed them, leading many to rail against him. A lawyer writing for the New Jersey Law Journal labeled Minton a "spokesman against freedom", calling him "a man of conspicuous judicial shortcomings, whose votes against civil liberties exceeded those of any other man on the Court, and who wrote comparatively few opinions of other kinds." Linda Gugin pointed out that Minton was a disappointment to liberals because he consistently chose order over freedom. Gugin also concludes that Minton had the strongest commitment to judicial restraint and ideological neutrality of any justice, past or present.

=== Politics ===
Although Minton was on the Supreme Court, he remained casually involved in Democratic internal politics. He wrote Truman several letters criticizing Justices Robert H. Jackson and Hugo Black, referring to Black as a demagogue. He also offered advice on dealing with Republican opposition in the Senate. In a 1954 letter, after Truman left office, he urged Truman to help focus public attention on the economy and away from communism, a threat he claimed the Republicans were exaggerating to avoid confronting their own problems.

After Truman's withdrawal from the 1952 presidential campaign, Minton made remarks indicating he had advised Truman to stay out of the contested New Hampshire primary election to begin with. In August 1956, a reporter asked Minton about his preferred candidate in the upcoming presidential election. Minton answered, "I have great confidence in Adlai Stevenson." He also remarked that Dwight D. Eisenhower was politically handicapped. Minton was lambasted in the media for his endorsement, which he attempted to retract a few days later after being advised to do so by other members of the Court.

=== Regular dissenter ===
Truman's other appointees to the Court provided consistent conservative votes, and during Minton's first years on the Court it was returned to the conservatism of the William Howard Taft era. While on the Court, Minton transformed from a New Deal senator into an almost reactionary judge as an ally of Justice Felix Frankfurter. Empirical coding of votes shows that Minton was the most conservative justice on the Court during his first year, and remained in the conservative half of the court for the duration of his career.

Minton did not enjoy the limited influence of his judicial role in the later years of his term, when he was more frequently in the minority in voting on cases. After the deaths of Chief Justice Fred M. Vinson and Justice Robert Jackson, Minton found himself with little support for many of his opinions, which led him to begin considering retirement.

The shifting position of the Court led to personal animosity between members of its two wings. Despite his disappointment over the Court's positions on some issues, Minton remained popular among his colleagues on the Court as he didn't take sides in their personal disagreements; he proved a soothing presence during a period marked by bitter personal feuds between strong personalities such as William O. Douglas and Felix Frankfurter.

Minton informed Eisenhower of his intention to retire in a letter on September 7, 1956, in which he dryly stated his retirement was authorized by law. Eisenhower responded with a brief note wishing him a happy retirement. Although he did not tell the president, Minton informed the members of the Court that his duties were too taxing on his health. His anemia had steadily worsened, slowing him physically and mentally. Minton served as a Justice until October 15, 1956, retiring after 7 years and 3 days of service. He was succeeded by William J. Brennan Jr.

== Later life ==
=== Retirement ===
Announcing his departure, Minton remarked, "There will be more interest in who will succeed me than in my passing. I'm an echo." Despite the health difficulties, Minton regretted his decision almost immediately.

Minton returned to his New Albany home, where he took a much lighter workload. He gave occasional lectures at Indiana University and continued to give public speeches from time to time. For several years after retiring from the Supreme Court, Minton occasionally accepted assignments to serve temporarily on one of the lower federal courts. He received an honorary doctorate degree from the University of Louisville. He took many trips around the United States, and two trips to Europe. In England, he received an honorary doctorate from Oxford University in 1956.

Despite his failing health, Minton remained active in the Democratic Party. He was most concerned with President Eisenhower, whom he believed was incompetent. He remained in regular correspondence with Truman, and the two met on several occasions at Democratic Party functions.

=== Death and legacy ===
In late March 1965, Minton was admitted to Floyd Memorial Hospital in New Albany, where it was found he was suffering internal bleeding. He died in his sleep early in the morning of April 9. Minton's wife was Roman Catholic; his funeral was held at the now-defunct Holy Trinity Catholic Church and was attended by many dignitaries, including several sitting members of the Supreme Court, the governors of Indiana and Kentucky, and several members of Congress. He was buried in the Holy Trinity Cemetery, on Green Valley Road in New Albany, next to Leo Receveur. Minton himself was nominally Catholic and had shunned Christianity for most of his life; he only began to occasionally attend Mass following his retirement. He left most of his personal papers and judicial records to the Truman Presidential Library. (Note: Four linear feet of Sherman Minton's papers are on deposit there. Various other papers are collected at a number of libraries around the country. Resources, research aids and bibliography, Sherman Minton, Federal Judicial Center. ("Sherman Minton". Archived from the original on May 30, 2010.) According to Sherman Minton, Jr., Minton's wife destroyed most of Minton's communications with Truman because she believed they were "undignified and occasionally profane." (See: Stewart, Margaret M., p. 304))

Minton is the eponym of the Sherman Minton Bridge, which carries Interstate 64 across the Ohio River, connecting western Louisville, Kentucky with New Albany, Indiana. Minton attended the dedication of the bridge at a 1962 ceremony. He is also the namesake of the annual Sherman Minton Moot Court Competition, held at the Indiana University Maurer School of Law. He is also honored by the Minton–Capehart Federal Building on Indiana World War Memorial Plaza in Indianapolis. A bronze bust of Minton was created and put on display in the Indiana Statehouse.

While some writers like Linda Gugin and legal historian William Radcliff have given high praise to Minton's logic in his written opinions, they point out that his positions had little long-term impact. Other legal historians, like Bernard Schwartz, have a more negative opinion of Minton's judicial career. Schwartz wrote that Minton "was below mediocrity as a Justice. His opinions, relatively few for his tenure, are less than third rate, characterized by their cavalier approach to complicated issues." Schwartz went on to say, "he ranks near the bottom of any list of Justices." Most of the precedents Minton helped establish were overturned by the Warren Court in the years immediately following his retirement. In total he wrote sixty-seven majority opinions along with several of the dissenting opinions. Gugin authored a work in rebuttal to Schwartz's harsh critique, saying that Minton's rulings were "predictable based on the principles of deference, precedent, and strict interpretation"; she attributed his poor ranking to the bias of reviewers in favor of judicial activism.

Minton's time on the court marked the end of a transitory period in the judiciary. Since Minton, justices have tended to serve increasingly longer terms on the court, which has had strong political science implications on the Supreme Court. The growing concept of judicial non-partisanship became the norm in American politics after Minton—he was the last member of Congress to be appointed to the Court. Linda Gugin and Professor James St. Clair have noted that the federal courts have lost a valuable point of view by not having experienced legislators among their ranks.

Minton played an important role behind the scenes of the Court as a peacemaker between its two opposing factions. These attempts to keep the peace led Justice Frankfurter to remark that while Minton would never be remembered as a great justice, he would be remembered as a great colleague by his fellow justices.

== Electoral history ==
Democratic Primary for Indiana's 3rd congressional district, 1920
Party	Candidate	Votes	%
Democratic	John Ewing	6,502	39.4
Democratic	Sherman Minton	3,170	19.2

United States Senate election 1934
Party	Candidate	Votes	%
Democratic	Sherman Minton	758,801	51.5
Republican	Arthur R. Robinson	700,103	47.5

United States Senate election 1940
Party	Candidate	Votes	%
Republican	Raymond E. Willis	888,070	50.5
Democratic	Sherman Minton	864,803	49.1

== See also ==
- List of justices of the Supreme Court of the United States
- List of United States Supreme Court justices by time in office
- United States Supreme Court cases during the Vinson Court
- United States Supreme Court cases during the Warren Court
- List of law clerks for the third seat of the Supreme Court of the United States

== Notes ==
Party political offices
Preceded by Albert Stump	Democratic nominee for United States Senator from Indiana (Class 1); 1934, 1940	Succeeded by M. Clifford Townsend
Preceded by J. Hamilton Lewis	Senate Democratic Whip; 1939–1941	Succeeded by J. Lister Hill
U.S. Senate
Preceded by Arthur Raymond Robinson	United States Senator (Class 1) from Indiana; 1935–1941; Served alongside: Frederick Van Nuys	Succeeded by Raymond E. Willis
Preceded by Hugo Black	Chairman of the Senate Lobby Investigation Committee; 1937–1940	Position abolished
Preceded by Allard H. Gasque	Chairman of the Senate Pensions Committee; 1939–1941	Succeeded by Henry H. Schwartz
Preceded by J. Hamilton Lewis	Senate Majority Whip; 1939–1941	Succeeded by J. Lister Hill
Legal offices
Preceded by Walter Emanuel Treanor	Judge of the United States Court of Appeals for the Seventh Circuit; 1941–1949	Succeeded by Walter C. Lindley
Preceded by Wiley Blount Rutledge	Associate Justice of the Supreme Court of the United States; 1949–1956	Succeeded by William J. Brennan Jr.
