= Linda C. Gugin =

Linda C. Gugin is a Professor Emeritus of Political Science at Indiana University Southeast, active member of the Indiana Historical Society, and author and coauthor of many books related to legal history. She is a principal biographer of Sherman Minton.

== Books ==
- Gugin, Linda; St. Clair, James E, eds. (2006). The Governors of Indiana. Indiana Historical Society Press in cooperation with the Indiana Historical Bureau – via Internet Archive. LCCN 2005-56796; ISBN 0-8719-5196-7, 978-0-8719-5196-0; OCLC 62697186 (all editions)
- Gugin, Linda C.; James E. St. Clair, eds. (2010). Justices of the Indiana Supreme Court. Indianapolis: Indiana Historical Society Press in cooperation with the Indiana Supreme Court. ISBN 978-0-87195-288-2.
- Gugin, Linda & James E. St. Clair (1997). Sherman Minton: New Deal Senator, Cold War Justice. Indianapolis: Indiana Historical Society. ISBN 0-87195-116-9.
- St. Clair, James E. & Linda Gugin (2002). Chief Justice Fred M. Vinson of Kentucky: A Political Biography. New York: McGraw-Hill. p. 408. ISBN 978-0-8131-2247-2.
